= Usage share of BitTorrent clients =

The usage share of BitTorrent clients is the percentage of users that use a particular BitTorrent client, regardless of version.

== 2026 ==
Top BitTorrent Clients in Aug 2026 by TorrentAnalytics
Rank	Client Family	Share
1	qBittorrent	48.71%
2	μTorrent	13.41%
3	BitComet	5.35%
4	Libtorrent	3.94%
5	Transmission	3.19%
6	Zona	2.66%
7	Deluge	2.13%
8	BitTorrent	1.97%
9	BiglyBT	1.67%
10	Tixati	1.49%

== 2020 ==
A study conducted in March 2020 by TorrentFreak
Rank	Application	Market Share
1	μTorrent	68.6%
2	BitTorrent	6.6%
3	Libtorrent (μTorrent's web interface reports this as its client ID)	6.3%
4	Transmission	5.1%
5	MediaGet	3.7%
6	qBittorrent	3.4%
7	Zona	3.3%
8	Deluge	0.9%
9	BitComet	0.6%
10	BiglyBT (operated by former developers of Vuze)	0.3%
11	Free Download Manager	0.2%
12	BitSpirit	0.2%
13	BitLord	0.1%
14	Tribler	<0.1%
14	FrostWire	<0.1%
14	Tixati	<0.1%
14	tTorrent	<0.1%
14	aTorrent	<0.1%
14	PicoTorrent	<0.1%

== 2015 ==
Lifehacker, a software weblog, took a survey of 13,823 readers' preferred BitTorrent clients in May 2015. It showed that μTorrent still maintains a sizable lead over competitors, despite concerns over adware and bloatware. Runner-up Transmission was praised for being lightweight, while qBittorrent was praised for being cross-platform and open-source, Deluge for its plugin library, and Tixati for its simplicity. Vuze, another notable client, failed to make an appearance in the top five for the first time.

Poll data from: Lifehacker
Rank	Application	Percentage of users' preferred clients	Number of votes
1	μTorrent	42.47%	5,870
2	Transmission	21.23%	2,935
3	qBittorrent	18.75%	2,592
4	Deluge	10.7%	1,479
5	Tixati	6.85%	947

== 2009 ==
=== Delft University of Technology ===
A study by the Tribler P2P research team at the Delft University of Technology. To generate this data, samples were taken from a number of swarms of users which were then used to identify which BitTorrent client each user was using, this data was used by TorrentFreak in the table below:

Samples of Global BitTorrent Client Usage Share (Percent & Peers)
Source	Date & Age	μTorrent	Vuze	BitTorrent (mainline)	BitComet	Transmission	FlashGet	Unknown	Tuotu	libtorrent	Xunlei	Other	Sample Size
	16 September 2011; 15 years ago	47.97% 267,466	22.49% 125,417	13.01% 72,536	1.01% 5,638	7% 39,011	?	6.22% 34,703	?	1.02% 5,703	?	1.27% 7,062	100% 557,536
	4 December 2009; 16 years ago	25.77% 92,086,035	24.08% 86,055,354	4.82% 17,207,544	4.31% 15,403,400	3.26% 11,637,110	1.09% 3,882,628	1% 3,590,584	0.71% 2,531,472	0.63% 2,251,736	29.31% 104,717,386	3.02% 10,806,362	100% 357,301,730
	18 October 2009; 16 years ago	60.16% 10,361	14.22% 2,449	8.65% 1,489	4.43% 763	3.65% 628	?	7.97% 1,373	?	0.31% 53	0.02% 3	0.59% 102	100% 17,221
	14 August 2009; 17 years ago	56.81%	18.13%	11.79%	4.71%	2.95%	?	4.21%	?	?	?	1.40%	100% 165,000+
	24 June 2009; 17 years ago	55.84%	16.85%	12.01%	6.50%	1.60%	?	4.02%	?	?	?	3.17%	100% 150,000+

== 2007 ==
=== Digital Music News ===
Digital Music News collected the data from PC Pitstop, a company that gathers data from computers using their free online virus and malware scanners. The program scans Windows Registry to find which clients have been installed, more than a million Microsoft Windows computers were surveyed.

Global install rate
Rank	Application	Install % on Windows desktops
1	LimeWire	18%
2	μTorrent	5.56%
3	BitTorrent (mainline)	2.28%
4	Vuze	2.11%
5	BitComet	1.89%
6	Bitlord	1.27%
