= UDP tracker =

The UDP tracker protocol is a high-performance low-overhead BitTorrent tracker protocol. It uses the stateless User Datagram Protocol (UDP) for data transmission instead of the HTTP protocol (over TCP) regular trackers use. The data is in a custom binary format instead of the standard bencode algorithm BitTorrent uses for most communication.

URLs for this protocol have the following format: udp://example.com:port.

== Comparison with the HTTP tracker ==
The UDP tracker is better optimized and puts less strain on the tracking server. Neither tracker has any effect on transfer speeds.

== Clients implementing the protocol ==
- BitComet
- BitLord
- BitRocket
- BitSpirit
- Deluge
- FlashGet
- KTorrent
- libbt
- Libtorrent (Rasterbar)
- qBittorrent
- rtorrent (implementing libTorrent (Rakshasa))
- μTorrent
- Turbo Torrent
- Vuze
- XBT Client
- MLDonkey
- Transmission
- Tixati

== Criticisms ==
- Limited IPv6 support (the protocol specifies a 32-bit integer for the IP address and supports pseudo-headers for 128-bit IPv6 addresses)
- No mechanism for index sites to scrape an entire tracker
  - This can be supported by traditional TCP scrape mechanisms, as it's not a performance issue.
- No mechanism for trackers to enforce client restrictions
- The UDP tracker protocol has no field to represent the user agent, as the HTTP protocol has. However, the convention to encode the user agent and version inside the peer_id field still applies.
- No mechanism for trackers to send warning messages
- No compression, especially problematic for large announce responses.
