= Comparison of BitTorrent clients =

The following is a general comparison of BitTorrent clients, which are computer programs designed for peer-to-peer file sharing using the BitTorrent protocol.

The BitTorrent protocol coordinates segmented file transfer among peers connected in a swarm. A BitTorrent client enables a user to exchange data as a peer in one or more swarms. Because BitTorrent is a peer-to-peer communications protocol that does not need a server, the BitTorrent definition of client differs from the conventional meaning expressed in the client–server model.

Bram Cohen, author of the BitTorrent protocol, made the first BitTorrent client, which he also called BitTorrent, and published it in July 2001.

Many BitTorrent programs are open-source software; others are freeware, adware or shareware. Some download managers, such as FlashGet and GetRight, are BitTorrent-ready. Opera 12, a web browser, can also transfer files via BitTorrent.

In 2013 Thunder Networking Technologies publicly revealed that some of their employees surreptitiously distributed a Trojan horse with certain releases of Xunlei, the company's BitTorrent-ready download manager. Xunlei is included in the comparison tables.

== Applications ==
=== General ===
BitTorrent client	Developer	Platform	Latest release		License	Notes
BitTorrent client	Developer	Platform	Version	Date	License	Notes
BiglyBT	Bigly Software	Linux	4.0.0.0	2023-09-22	GPL-2.0-or-later	
BiglyBT	Bigly Software	macOS	4.0.0.0	2023-09-22	GPL-2.0-or-later	
BiglyBT	Bigly Software	Windows	4.0.0.0	2023-09-22	GPL-2.0-or-later	
BiglyBT	Bigly Software	Android		2023-09-22	GPL-2.0-or-later	
BitComet	BitComet Development Group	macOS	2.10	2024-10-09	Proprietary, Adware	(Note: Portable version available.)
BitComet	BitComet Development Group	Windows	2.10	2024-10-09	Proprietary, Adware	(Note: Portable version available.)
BitLord	House of Life	macOS	2.4.6-348	2019-10-24	Proprietary, Adware	(Note: Installs WhenU adware.)
BitLord	House of Life	Windows	2.4.6-358	2022-08-26	Proprietary, Adware	(Note: Installs WhenU adware.)
BitTorrent	BitTorrent	Android	8.2.1	2024-03-20	Proprietary, Adware	
BitTorrent	BitTorrent	macOS	7.4.3.45549	2020-05-20	Proprietary, Adware	
BitTorrent	BitTorrent	Windows	7.11.0.46555	2022-11-22	Proprietary, Adware	
Deluge	various	BSD	2.2.0	2025-04-28	GPL-3.0-or-later	
Deluge	various	Linux	2.2.0	2025-04-28	GPL-3.0-or-later	
Deluge	various	macOS	2.2.0	2025-04-28	GPL-3.0-or-later	
Deluge	various	Solaris	2.2.0	2025-04-28	GPL-3.0-or-later	
Deluge	various	Windows	2.2.0	2025-04-28	GPL-3.0-or-later	
FlashGet	Trend Media	Windows	3.7.0.1220	2013-05-17	Proprietary	(Note: FlashGet (standalone application) is not FlashGot (Firefox Addon).)
Free Download Manager	alervd	Android	6.30.3.6518	2025-10-31	Proprietary	
Free Download Manager	alervd	Linux	6.30.3.6518	2025-10-31	Proprietary	
Free Download Manager	alervd	macOS	6.30.3.6518	2025-10-31	Proprietary	
Free Download Manager	alervd	Windows	6.30.3.6518	2025-10-31	Proprietary	
FrostWire	The FrostWire Project	Android	2.9.4	2024-12-26	GPL-3.0-or-later	
FrostWire	The FrostWire Project	Linux	6.13.4-build-324	2024-10-16	GPL-3.0-or-later	
FrostWire	The FrostWire Project	macOS	6.13.4-build-324	2024-10-16	GPL-3.0-or-later	
FrostWire	The FrostWire Project	Windows	6.13.4-build-324	2024-10-16	GPL-3.0-or-later	
KGet	KDE	BSD			GPL-2.0-or-later	
KGet	KDE	Linux			GPL-2.0-or-later	
KTorrent	Joris Guisson, Ivan Vasić	BSD	25.08.0	2025-08-14	GPL-2.0-or-later	
KTorrent	Joris Guisson, Ivan Vasić	Linux	25.08.0	2025-08-14	GPL-2.0-or-later	
KTorrent	Joris Guisson, Ivan Vasić	macOS	25.08.0	2025-08-14	GPL-2.0-or-later	
Lftp	Alexander V. Lukya	BSD	4.9.3	2024-11-08	GPL-3.0-or-later	
Lftp	Alexander V. Lukya	Linux	4.9.3	2024-11-08	GPL-3.0-or-later	
Lftp	Alexander V. Lukya	macOS	4.9.3	2024-11-08	GPL-3.0-or-later	
Lftp	Alexander V. Lukya	Windows	4.9.3	2024-11-08	GPL-3.0-or-later	
LimeWire	Lime Wire LLC	Linux	5.5.16	2010-10-26	GPL-2.0-or-later	
LimeWire	Lime Wire LLC	macOS	5.5.16	2010-10-26	GPL-2.0-or-later	
LimeWire	Lime Wire LLC	Windows	5.5.16	2010-10-26	GPL-2.0-or-later	
Miro	Participatory Culture Foundation	Linux	6.0	2013-04-05	GPL-2.0-or-later	
Miro	Participatory Culture Foundation	macOS	6.0	2013-04-05	GPL-2.0-or-later	
Miro	Participatory Culture Foundation	Windows	6.0	2013-04-05	GPL-2.0-or-later	
MLDonkey	MLDonkey Project	BSD	3.2.1	2024-08-20	GPL-2.0-or-later	
MLDonkey	MLDonkey Project	Linux	3.2.1	2024-08-20	GPL-2.0-or-later	
MLDonkey	MLDonkey Project	macOS	3.2.1	2024-08-20	GPL-2.0-or-later	
MLDonkey	MLDonkey Project	MorphOS	3.2.1	2024-08-20	GPL-2.0-or-later	
MLDonkey	MLDonkey Project	Solaris	3.2.1	2024-08-20	GPL-2.0-or-later	
MLDonkey	MLDonkey Project	Windows	3.2.1	2024-08-20	GPL-2.0-or-later	
μTorrent	BitTorrent	Android	8.2.2	2024-03-21	Proprietary, Adware	(Note: The option to disable ads is included in the settings.)
μTorrent	BitTorrent	macOS	1.8.7.45548	2020-01-30	Proprietary, Adware	(Note: The option to disable ads is included in the settings.)
μTorrent	BitTorrent	Windows	3.6.0.47006	2024-01-11	Proprietary, Adware	(Note: The option to disable ads is included in the settings.)
Opera 12	Opera Software	FreeBSD	12.16		Proprietary	(Note: Web browser.)
Opera 12	Opera Software	Linux	12.16		Proprietary	(Note: Web browser.)
Opera 12	Opera Software	macOS	12.16		Proprietary	(Note: Web browser.)
Opera 12	Opera Software	Solaris	12.16		Proprietary	(Note: Web browser.)
Opera 12	Opera Software	Windows	12.17		Proprietary	(Note: Web browser.)
qBittorrent	Christophe Dumez	BSD	5.2.3	2026-07-07	GPL-2.0-or-later	
qBittorrent	Christophe Dumez	Linux	5.2.3	2026-07-07	GPL-2.0-or-later	
qBittorrent	Christophe Dumez	Haiku	5.2.3	2026-07-07	GPL-2.0-or-later	
qBittorrent	Christophe Dumez	macOS	5.2.3	2026-07-07	GPL-2.0-or-later	
qBittorrent	Christophe Dumez	OS/2	5.2.3	2026-07-07	GPL-2.0-or-later	
qBittorrent	Christophe Dumez	Windows	5.2.3	2026-07-07	GPL-2.0-or-later	
rTorrent	Jari Sundell	BSD	0.16.21	2026-08-26	GPL-2.0-or-later	(Note: No built-in disk cache but a delayed sync.)
rTorrent	Jari Sundell	Linux	0.16.21	2026-08-26	GPL-2.0-or-later	(Note: No built-in disk cache but a delayed sync.)
rTorrent	Jari Sundell	macOS	0.16.21	2026-08-26	GPL-2.0-or-later	(Note: No built-in disk cache but a delayed sync.)
rTorrent	Jari Sundell	Solaris	0.16.21	2026-08-26	GPL-2.0-or-later	(Note: No built-in disk cache but a delayed sync.)
rTorrent	Jari Sundell	Windows	0.16.21	2026-08-26	GPL-2.0-or-later	(Note: No built-in disk cache but a delayed sync.)
Robert	Sponge, co-developer of I2P	BSD	0.0.40	2013	GPL	
Robert	Sponge, co-developer of I2P	Linux	0.0.40	2013	GPL	
Robert	Sponge, co-developer of I2P	macOS	0.0.40	2013	GPL	
Robert	Sponge, co-developer of I2P	Windows	0.0.40	2013	GPL	
Shareaza	Shareaza Development Team	Windows	2.7.10.2	2017-09-18	GPL-2.0-or-later	(Note: Maximum active torrent number depends on respective user settings and is limited to 31.)
Tixati	Kevin Hearn	Linux	3.31	2024-12-11	Proprietary	(Note: Lightweight client, Portable version available, option to keep all peers unchoked available. Integral encrypted chatrooms that allow streaming audio and video, link sharing and searching.)
Tixati	Kevin Hearn	Windows	3.31	2024-12-11	Proprietary	(Note: Lightweight client, Portable version available, option to keep all peers unchoked available. Integral encrypted chatrooms that allow streaming audio and video, link sharing and searching.)
Tonido	CodeLathe	BSD	14.90.0.34030	2017-01-13	Proprietary	
Tonido	CodeLathe	Linux	14.90.0.34030	2017-01-13	Proprietary	
Tonido	CodeLathe	macOS	14.90.0.34030	2017-01-13	Proprietary	
Tonido	CodeLathe	Windows	14.90.0.34030	2017-01-13	Proprietary	
Transmission	various	BSD	4.1.3	2026-06-30	GPL-2.0-only or GPL-3.0-only; MIT	
Transmission	various	Linux	4.1.3	2026-06-30	GPL-2.0-only or GPL-3.0-only; MIT	
Transmission	various	macOS	4.1.3	2026-06-30	GPL-2.0-only or GPL-3.0-only; MIT	
Transmission	various	OpenWrt	4.1.3	2026-06-30	GPL-2.0-only or GPL-3.0-only; MIT	
Transmission	various	Solaris	4.1.3	2026-06-30	GPL-2.0-only or GPL-3.0-only; MIT	
Transmission	various	Windows	4.1.3	2026-06-30	GPL-2.0-only or GPL-3.0-only; MIT	
Tribler	The Tribler Team	Linux	8.4.3	2026-06-18	GPL-3.0-only	(Note: Fully distributed keyword search; integrated anti-spam measures.)
Tribler	The Tribler Team	macOS	8.4.3	2026-06-18	GPL-3.0-only	(Note: Fully distributed keyword search; integrated anti-spam measures.)
Tribler	The Tribler Team	Windows	8.4.3	2026-06-18	GPL-3.0-only	(Note: Fully distributed keyword search; integrated anti-spam measures.)
Vuze (Note: Formerly Azureus.)	Vuze	Android	5.7.6.0	2017-11-02	Proprietary (platform); GPL-2.0-or-later (core engine); Adware	(Note: The only client to bridge between i2p and the clearnet.)
Vuze	Vuze	Linux	5.7.6.0	2017-11-02	Proprietary (platform); GPL-2.0-or-later (core engine); Adware	(Note: The only client to bridge between i2p and the clearnet.)
Vuze	Vuze	macOS	5.7.6.0	2017-11-02	Proprietary (platform); GPL-2.0-or-later (core engine); Adware	(Note: The only client to bridge between i2p and the clearnet.)
Vuze	Vuze	Windows	5.7.6.0	2017-11-02	Proprietary (platform); GPL-2.0-or-later (core engine); Adware	(Note: The only client to bridge between i2p and the clearnet.)
Xunlei	Thunder Networking Technologies	Android	7.53.0.8245	2022-10-11	Proprietary, Adware	
Xunlei	Thunder Networking Technologies	iOS	1.5.8	2022-09-29	Proprietary, Adware	
Xunlei	Thunder Networking Technologies	macOS	5.0.2.65551	2022-06-16	Proprietary, Adware	
Xunlei	Thunder Networking Technologies	Windows			Proprietary, Adware	
BitTorrent client	Developer	Platform	Latest release		License	Notes
BitTorrent client	Developer	Platform	Version	Date	License	Notes

=== Operating system support ===
BitTorrent client	Windows	macOS	GNU/Linux	BSD	iOS	Android	Other
BiglyBT	Yes	Yes	Yes	Yes	No	Yes	No
BitComet	Yes	Yes	No	No	No	No	No
BitLord	Yes	Yes	No	No	No	No	No
BitTorrent	Yes	Yes	No	No	No	Yes	No
Deluge	Yes	Yes	Yes	Yes	No	No	Solaris
FlashGet	Yes	No	No	No	No	No	No
Free Download Manager	Yes	Yes	Yes	No	No	Yes	No
Frostwire	Yes	Yes	Yes	Yes	No	Yes	Unix-like z/OS; Solaris; OS/2 eComStation; ArcaOS
KGet	No	No	Yes	Yes	No	No	No
KTorrent	No	Yes	Yes	Yes	No	No	No
Lftp	Yes	Yes	Yes	Yes	No	No	No
LimeWire	Yes	Yes	Yes	Yes	No	No	Yes
Miro	Yes	Yes	Yes	Yes	No	No	No
MLDonkey	Yes	Yes	Yes	Yes	No	No	Solaris; MorphOS
μTorrent	Yes	Yes	Web	No	No	Yes	No
Opera 12	Yes (Note: x86-32 and x86-64 builds available)	Yes	Yes	Yes	No	Yes	Solaris
qBittorrent	Yes	Yes	Yes	Yes	No	No	OS/2 (Note: Including eComStation and ArcaOS.); FreeBSD; Haiku
Robert	Yes	Yes	Yes	Yes	No	No	No
rTorrent	Yes (Note: Through Cygwin.)	Yes	Yes	Yes	No	No	Solaris
Shareaza	Yes	No	No	No	No	No	No
Tixati	Yes	No	Yes	No	No	No	No
Tonido	Yes	Yes	Yes	Yes	No	No	No
Transmission	Yes	Yes	Yes	Yes	Yes (Note: Through Cydia.)	Yes	Solaris
Tribler	Yes	Yes	Yes	Yes	No	No	No
Vuze	Yes	Yes	Yes	Yes	No	Yes	No
Xunlei	Yes	Yes	No	No	Yes	Yes	No
BitTorrent client	Windows	macOS	GNU/Linux	BSD	iOS	Android	Other

=== Interface and programming ===
BitTorrent client	GUI	Remote	CLI	Other	Programming language	Based on	IPv6	μTP
BiglyBT	Yes	Yes	No (Note: Only has options for launching the GUI)	Telnet, XML over HTTP remote control API	Java, SWT	Vuze	Yes	Yes
BitComet	Yes	Yes	Partial	No	C++	-	Yes	No
BitLord	Yes	No	No	No	Python, C++	libtorrent (Rasterbar)	Yes	No
BitTorrent 5, Mainline	Yes	No	Partial	No	Python	-	No	No
Deluge	Yes	Yes	Yes	Daemon	Python, C++	libtorrent (Rasterbar)	Yes	Yes
FlashGet	Yes	No	No	No	?	?	No	No
Free Download Manager	Yes	Yes	Partial	No	C++	libtorrent (Rasterbar)	No	No
Frostwire	Yes	No	No	No	Java	libtorrent (Rasterbar)	No	Yes
KGet	Yes	Yes	Partial (Note: Qdbus interface)	No	C++	-	Yes	No
KTorrent	Yes	Yes	Partial	No	C++	-	Yes	Yes
lftp	No	No	Yes	No	C++	-	Yes	No
LimeWire	Yes	No	No	No	Java	libtorrent (Rasterbar)	No	No
Miro	Yes	No	No	No	C++	libtorrent (Rasterbar)	No	No
MLDonkey	No	Third Party	Partial	Telnet	OCaml	-	No	No
μTorrent	Yes	Yes	No	RESTful Web API	C++	-	Yes	Yes
Opera 12	Yes	No	No	No	C++	-	Yes	No
qBittorrent	Yes	Yes	Partial	No	Python, C++	libtorrent (Rasterbar)	Yes	Yes
rTorrent	No	Third Party	Yes	SCGI	C++	libTorrent (Rakshasa)	Yes	No
Shareaza	Yes	Yes	Partial	No	C++	-	No	No
Tixati	Yes	Yes	No	Web interface	C++	-	Yes	Yes
Tonido	No	Yes	No	No	C++	libtorrent (Rasterbar)	No	No
Transmission	Yes	Yes	Yes	Daemon, JSON-RPC over HTTP remote control API	C++ (rewritten from C), Objective-C	libtransmission	Yes	Yes
Tribler	Yes	Partial	Partial	No	Python, C++	libtorrent (Rasterbar)	No	Yes
Vuze	Yes	Yes	Partial	Telnet, XML over HTTP remote control API	Java, SWT	-	Yes	Yes
Xunlei	Yes	No	No	remote control over internet	C++	-	No	No
BitTorrent client	GUI	Web	CLI	Other	Programming language	Based on	IPv6	μTP

=== Features I ===
BitTorrent client	Protocol version	Magnet URI (BEP 9)	Preload Magnet metadata (Note: For a torrent added from a Magnet link, obtain the list of files (and other metadata) before prompting the user for a download location.) (BEP 9)	Super-seeding (BEP 16)	Embedded tracker (BEP 28)	UPnP	NAT Port Mapping Protocol	NAT traversal (BEP 55)	DHT protocol (BEP 5)	Peer exchange(PEX) (BEP 11)	Encryption	UDP tracker (BEP 15)	Local Peer Discovery (BEP 14)	Proxy server
BiglyBT	1, 2	Yes	Yes	Yes	Yes	Yes	Yes	Yes	Yes	Yes	Yes	Yes	Yes	HTTP(S); SOCKS4-4a-5
BitComet	1, 2	Yes	No	Yes	Separate download	Yes	Yes	Yes	Yes	Yes	Yes	Yes	No	HTTP 1.1, SOCKS4-4a-5
BitLord	1	Yes	No	No	No	Yes	Yes	Yes	Yes	Yes	Yes	Yes	Yes	HTTP 1.1, SOCKS4-4a-5
BitTorrent 5, Mainline	1	No	No	No	Yes (Note: Tracker included with Linux binaries and with source, but not with Windows binary.)	Yes	Yes	No	Yes	Yes	Yes	No	No	Yes
Deluge	1,2	Yes	Partial (Note: This is done manually. Right click an item and select "Force Re-Check". This will trigger preload. Note, if deluge is restarted before preload finishes, it will continue downloading torrent content.)	Yes	No	Yes	Yes	Yes	Yes	Yes	Yes	Yes	Yes	HTTP(S), SOCKS4-5
FlashGet	1	No	No	No	No	No	No	No	Yes	No	Yes	No	No	No
Free Download Manager	1	Yes	No	No	No	No	No	No	Yes	Yes	No	No	No	No
KTorrent	1	Yes	Yes	Yes	No	Yes	Yes	Yes	Yes	Yes	Yes	Yes	No	HTTP, SOCKS4-5
LimeWire	1	Partial	No	Yes	Yes	Yes	Yes	No	Yes	Yes	Yes	Yes	No	No
MLDonkey	1	Yes	No	No	Yes	Yes	Yes	No	Yes	No	No	Yes	No	No
μTorrent	1	Yes	Yes	Yes	Yes	Yes	Yes	Yes	Yes (Note: μTorrent's DHT implementation Archived 18 March 2009 at the Wayback Machine is the same as Mainline and BitComet's, but unfortunately this is incompatible with Azureus's implementation.)	Yes (Note: Exchanging with BT 6 and μTorrent clients (and now MooPolice).)	Yes	Yes	Yes	HTTP(S), SOCKS4-5
Opera 12	1	No	No	No	Yes	No	No	No	No	Yes	No	No	No	No
qBittorrent	1, 2	Yes	Yes	Yes	Yes	Yes	Yes	Yes	Yes	Yes	Yes	Yes	Yes	HTTP(S), SOCKS4-5 (Note: v4.6.0 added (experimental) I2P support to provide anonymity.)
rTorrent	1	Yes	No	Yes	No	No	No	No	Yes	Yes	Yes	Yes	No	No
Shareaza	1	Yes	No	No	No	Yes	Yes	No	Yes (Note: Since Shareaza v2.6.0.0, Shareaza includes Mainline DHT support. Also, Shareaza can use the Gnutella2 network to find other Gnutella2 clients sharing the same torrent. This also includes clients who do not actively seed the torrent in question anymore, as long as file hashes (such as sha1 for example) are known.)	Yes	No	Yes (Note: Since Shareaza v2.5.5.1 r9064.)	No	No
Tixati	1, 2	Yes	Yes	Yes	No	Yes	Yes	Yes	Yes	Yes	Yes	Yes	Yes	(Note: Only with out going without DHT if anonymity required.)
Tonido	1	No	No	No	No	Yes	Yes	Yes	Yes	No	No	No	No	No
Transmission	1	Yes	Patch available	No	No	Yes	Yes	No	Yes	Yes (Note: Exchanges with μTorrent and Azureus peers.)	Yes	Yes	Yes	No
Tribler	1	Yes	No	No	Yes	Yes	Yes	No	Yes	Yes	Yes	No	No	(Note: Uses P2P onion routing to provide anonymity.)
Vuze	1	Yes	Yes	Yes	Yes	Yes	Yes	Yes (Note: Since version 2.5.0.2. It's UDP based, an experimental feature and only supported by other Azureus clients.)	Yes (Note: Has its own DHT, a mainline-DHT compatible implementation is available as plugin.)	Yes	Yes	Yes	Plugin	HTTP(S)?, SOCKS4-4a-5
Xunlei	1	Yes	No	No	Yes	Yes	Yes	Yes	Yes	Yes	No	Yes	Yes	HTTP, SOCKS5, FTP
BitTorrent client	Protocol version	Magnet URI	Preload Magnet metadata	Super-seeding	Embedded tracker	UPnP	NAT Port Mapping Protocol	NAT traversal	DHT	Peer exchange	Encryption	UDP tracker	Local Peer Discovery	Proxy server

=== Features II ===
BitTorrent client	Cache (Note: Reduces disk usage, file fragmentation (in case it is not preallocated) and latencies via larger written blocks and cached data for hash checking finished pieces.)	Hash Web seeding	HTTP Web seeding	Broad-catching (RSS) (BEP 36)	Prioritization	Selective downloads (BEP 53)	Sequential downloading	SOCKS	Tracker exchange (BEP 28)	Remote control via web	Search engine (BEP 18)	Auto updates	Reviews and Comments
BiglyBT	Yes		Yes	Yes	Yes	Yes	Yes	Yes		Yes	Yes	Yes	Yes
BitComet	Yes	No	Yes	Beta	Yes	Yes	Yes (Note: Called "preview mode" Archived 4 October 2013 at the Wayback Machine)	Yes	No	Yes	Partial (Note: Built-in Web browser.)	Yes	No
BitLord	Yes	No	Partial (Note: Does not support HTTP redirection (status codes: 301, 302, 303, 307).) (Note: Does not support HTTPS.)	Yes	Yes	Yes	No	Yes	No	No	Partial	Yes	No
BitTorrent 5, Mainline	No	Yes	Partial	No	Yes	Yes	No	No	No	No	Yes	Yes	No
Deluge	Yes	Yes	Partial	Plugin	Yes	Yes	Yes	Yes	No	Yes	No	via PMS	No
FlashGet	No	No		No	No	No	No	No	No	No	No	No	No
Free Download Manager	No	Yes	No	No	Yes	Yes	Yes	No	No	Yes	No	Optional	No
KTorrent	Yes	Yes		Yes	Yes	Yes	Yes	Yes	No	Yes	Partial	via PMS	No
LimeWire	Yes	Yes	No	No	Yes	Yes	No	Yes	No	No	No	Yes	No
MLDonkey	Yes	No		3rd party bash script	Yes	No	No	No	No	Yes	Partial	via PMS	No
μTorrent	Yes	Yes	Partial	Yes	Yes	Yes	Yes (Note: Only available in Pro and web version.From version 3.0 this feature is called "Streaming mode". The number of pieces to download sequentially is configurable)	Yes	No	Yes	Yes	Yes	Yes
Opera 12	No	No		Yes (Note: Opera has a feed aggregator that displays feeds like emails.)	No	No	No	No	No	No	Partial	Yes (Note: Windows and Mac OS X only; via PMS on Linux.)	No
qBittorrent	Yes	Yes	Partial	Yes	Yes	Yes	Yes	Yes	Partial (Note: Hard-coded as disabled in newer versions.)	Yes	Yes	via PMS	No
rTorrent	Partial	No	No	3rd party utility	Yes	Yes	No	No	No	Yes	No	via PMS	No
Shareaza	Yes	Yes	No	No	Yes	Yes (Note: Since Shareaza v2.4.0.2 r7924.)	in mod client	No	Yes (Note: Since Shareaza v2.5.3.1.) (Note: Shareaza also uses G2 to transmit download metadata, such as BitTorrent trackers to other G2 clients.)	Yes	Yes	Yes	No
Tixati	Yes	Yes	Yes	Yes	Yes	Yes	Yes	Yes	Yes	Yes	No	Yes	No
Tonido	No	No		No	Yes	Yes	No	No	No	Yes	No	Yes	No
Transmission	Yes	No	Partial (Note: Adds HTTP referer header in request on HTTP redirection (useful behavior).)	No	Yes	No	No	No	No	Yes	No	Yes	No
Tribler	Yes	No	No	Yes	Yes	Yes	No	No	No	Partial	Yes (DHT)	Yes	No
Vuze	Yes		Yes	Yes	Yes	Yes	in paid version	Yes	No	Plugin (Note: Provides a Java-based and a simple HTML/JS based WebUI.)	Yes	Yes	Yes
Xunlei	Yes	No		Yes	Yes	Yes	Yes			Yes	No	Yes	No
BitTorrent client	Cache	Hash Web seeding	HTTP Web seeding	Broad-catching (RSS)	Prioritization	Selective downloads	Sequential downloading	SOCKS	Tracker exchange	Remote control via web	Search engine	Auto updates	Reviews and Comments

== Libraries ==
General

BitTorrent library	Initial release	Platform	Latest release		License	Notes
BitTorrent library	Initial release	Platform	Version	Date	License	Notes
libtorrent (Rasterbar)	8 September 2005; 21 years ago	Linux	2.0.9, 1.2.19; 2.1.1	2023-05-22; 2026-08-10	BSD-3-Clause	
libtorrent (Rasterbar)	8 September 2005; 21 years ago	macOS	2.0.9, 1.2.19; 2.1.1	2023-05-22; 2026-08-10	BSD-3-Clause	
libtorrent (Rasterbar)	8 September 2005; 21 years ago	Windows	2.0.9, 1.2.19; 2.1.1	2023-05-22; 2026-08-10	BSD-3-Clause	
MonoTorrent	September 2006; 20 years ago	Linux	3.0.2	2024-08-04	MIT	
MonoTorrent	September 2006; 20 years ago	macOS	3.0.2	2024-08-04	MIT	
MonoTorrent	September 2006; 20 years ago	Windows	3.0.2	2024-08-04	MIT	
rTorrent (libTorrent Rakshasa)	15 July 2004; 22 years ago	Linux	0.16.22	2026-09-02	GPL-2.0-or-later (Note: With OpenSSL exception.)	(Note: No built-in cache-disk cache but a delayed sync.)
rTorrent (libTorrent Rakshasa)	15 July 2004; 22 years ago	macOS	0.16.22	2026-09-02	GPL-2.0-or-later	(Note: No built-in cache-disk cache but a delayed sync.)
BitTorrent library	Initial release	Platform	Latest release		License	Notes
BitTorrent library	Initial release	Platform	Version	Date	License	Notes

Operating system support and programming language

BitTorrent library	GNU/Linux	Windows	macOS	API	Programming language
libtorrent (Rasterbar)	Yes	Yes	Yes	Yes	C++
MonoTorrent	Yes	Yes	Yes	Yes	C#
rTorrent (libTorrent Rakshasa)	Yes	No	Yes	Yes	C++
BitTorrent library	Linux	Windows	macOS	API	Programming language

Supported features 1

BitTorrent library	Protocol version	Super-seeding	Tracker	UPnP (Note: Automatically configure port forwarding (requires Router with UPnP support))	NAT Port Mapping Protocol	NAT traversal (Note: Many clients claim to support this, but just UPnP calls for opening a TCP port is not effective and disabled by factory default in most new hardware. "UDP NAT Traversal" is the proper working solution, supported by just a few.)	DHT (Note: DHT permits use of trackerless torrents (with supporting clients) to resume normal torrents when their tracker is down. However, some trackers that register their users for keeping tabs on fair usage (such as a ratio of bytes downloaded to uploaded) may not reliably measure and update usage for users employing DHT.)	Peer exchange	Encryption	UDP tracker	Local Peer Discovery	Fast extensions	Magnet URI	μTP
libtorrent (Rasterbar)	1, 2	Yes	Yes	Yes	Yes	Yes	Yes	Yes	Yes	Yes	Yes	Yes	Yes	Yes
MonoTorrent	1, 2	Yes	Yes	Yes	Yes	No	Yes	Yes	Yes	Yes	Yes	Yes	Yes	No
rTorrent (libTorrent Rakshasa)	1	Yes	Yes	No	?	?	Yes	Yes	Yes	Yes	Yes	No	Yes	No
BitTorrent library	Protocol version	Super-seeding	Tracker	UPnP	NAT Port Mapping Protocol	NAT traversal	DHT	Peer exchange	Encryption	UDP tracker	Local Peer Discovery	Fast extensions	Magnet URI	μTP

Supported features 2

BitTorrent library	Cache (Note: Reduces disk usage, file fragmentation (in case it is not preallocated) and latencies due to larger written blocks and cached data for hash checking finished pieces.)	Web seeding (Note: Recently implemented (unofficial) web seeding feature, see HTTP-Based Seeding Specification Archived 28 October 2008 at the Wayback Machine)	WebTorrent	Broadcatching (RSS)	Prioritization	Selective downloads	SOCKS	Remote control via web	Engine
libtorrent (Rasterbar)	Yes	Yes	Yes	No	Yes	Yes	Yes	Yes	?
MonoTorrent	Yes	Yes	No	Yes	Yes	Yes	No	Yes	No
rTorrent (libTorrent Rakshasa)	Partial	No	No	No	Yes	Yes	No	Yes	No
BitTorrent library	Cache	Web seeding	WebTorrent	Broadcatching (RSS)	Prioritization	Selective downloads	SOCKS	Remote control via web	Engine

== See also ==
- Anonymous P2P
- BitTorrent tracker
- Comparison of BitTorrent sites
- Comparison of BitTorrent tracker software
- Comparison of file sharing applications
- File sharing
- Open Music Model
- Timeline of file sharing
