= Mainline DHT =

Peer-to-peer overlay network

Mainline DHT is the name given to the Kademlia-based distributed hash table (DHT) used by BitTorrent clients to find peers via the BitTorrent protocol. The idea of using a DHT for distributed tracking in BitTorrent was first implemented in Azureus 2.3.0.0 (now known as Vuze) in May 2005, from which it gained significant popularity. Unrelated but around the same time, BitTorrent, Inc. released a similar DHT into their client called Mainline DHT, and thus popularized the use of distributed tracking in the BitTorrent protocol. Measurement showed that by 2013, the concurrent number of users of Mainline DHT is from 16 million to 28 million, with intra-day changes of at least 10 million.

== Description ==
Mainline DHT is based on the popular Kademlia DHT design. Prior to usage of a DHT for distributing peers, trackers were the only method of finding peers. The key feature of using the DHT over trackers is that the decentralized approach favours the nature of the BitTorrent protocol. The DHT operates by distributing lists of peers identified by the SHA-1 hash of the torrent.

Each client randomly selects a 160-bit node ID, and the distance between nodes is calculated by the XOR of their IDs. Mainline DHT uses k-buckets to track known nodes.

To download a file, a client first queries its k-buckets for nodes closest to the torrent's info_hash. It connects to these nodes to find peers. If peers are found, the client downloads the file from multiple sources, similar to the standard BitTorrent protocol.

=== Routing table ===
Each node keeps a routing table of the nodes it knows, divided into "buckets" that each cover a range of the 160-bit ID space. A bucket holds at most K nodes with the specification recommending K to be eight. Nodes are classed as good, questionable or bad. A node is good if it has responded to one of the client's queries within the last 15 minutes, or has responded before and has sent the client a query within the last 15 minutes. After 15 minutes of inactivity it becomes questionable, and a node that fails to respond to several queries in a row is bad. Buckets that have not changed in 15 minutes are refreshed by looking up a random ID within the bucket's range.

Buckets are structured differently from those in Kademlia. Instead of a list of 160 buckets, BitTorrent starts with only one bucket. When a bucket becomes full, one of two things can happen:

- The bucket is split.
- Old nodes are pinged (as in Kademlia).

Splitting is an operation that occurs only if our own node ID falls within the range of the bucket. The bucket being split is replaced by two new buckets each with half the range of the old bucket and the nodes from the old bucket are distributed among the two new ones.

There are two benefits to this bucket implementation:

- Less memory is used for a routing table of less than 160 buckets.
- When searching buckets, it isn't necessary to retrieve additional nodes from adjacent buckets because it is guaranteed that there are enough in the current bucket.

=== Queries ===
KRPC defines four queries:

- ping checks whether a node is reachable. The query and the response each carry only the sender's node ID.
- find_node asks for the contact information of the node with a given ID. The queried node returns that node if it knows it, and otherwise the K closest good nodes in its routing table.
- get_peers asks for peers in the swarm of a given infohash. If the queried node knows such peers, it returns them in a values key; otherwise it returns the K nodes in its routing table closest to the infohash. The response always includes a token.
- announce_peer announces that the querying node is downloading a torrent on a given port. It must include the token received from an earlier get_peers query to the same node. An optional implied_port argument tells the receiver to use the source port of the UDP packet instead, which helps peers behind network address translation.

Contact information is sent in a compact form: 6 bytes per peer (an IPv4 address and a port) and 26 bytes per node (the 20-byte node ID followed by the 6-byte address).

=== Bootstrapping ===
A node with an empty routing table needs to learn of at least one existing node before it can take part in the network. A torrent file can supply such information in a nodes key, which should list the K closest nodes in the torrent creator's routing table or a known good node. Clients that support the DHT also signal this in the BitTorrent handshake by setting the last bit of the reserved bytes high, and then send a PORT message giving their DHT UDP port; the receiving client pings that address and, if it responds, adds it to its routing table. Once a node has a contact, it sends find_node queries to progressively closer nodes until it finds no closer ones, filling its routing table with the nodes nearest to its own ID. The specification recommends saving the routing table between sessions.

=== Magnet links ===
Together with the metadata exchange extension defined in BEP 9, the DHT lets a client join a swarm from a magnet link alone, without needing a tracker or a torrent file. A magnet link carries the torrent's infohash, and if it doesn’t specify a tracker, the client finds peers through the DHT. The client then downloads the info dictionary from those peers in 16 KiB blocks using the ut_metadata extension, which is negotiated through the extension protocol of BEP 10, and checks the completed metadata against the infohash.

=== Operation ===
The SHA-1 hash of a torrent, the infohash, is synonymous with a Kademlia key, which is used for finding peers (values) in the overlay network. To find peers in a swarm, a node sends a get_peers query with the infohash as key (equivalent to a Kademlia FIND_VALUE) to the closest known nodes (with respect to the key distance). Like Kademlia, if the node does not return the value (peers), it persists further in an iterative operation. However, after the search is exhausted, the client then also inserts the peer contact information for itself onto the responding nodes with IDs closest to the infohash of the torrent.

==== Token ====
Nodes use an additional measure known as a token to ensure others don't sign up other hosts for torrents. The return value for a query for peers includes this opaque value. For a node to announce that its controlling peer is downloading a torrent, it must present the token received from the same queried node in a recent query for peers. When a node attempts to "announce" a torrent, the queried node checks the token against the querying node's IP address.

Mainline DHT uses the SHA-1 hash of the IP address concatenated onto a secret that changes every five minutes for a token value. Tokens up to ten minutes old are accepted.

=== KRPC ===
A node in the Mainline DHT consists of an IP and port combination. Nodes communicate via an RPC protocol called KRPC. KRPC is a simple protocol that consists of nodes sending messages (queries, replies and errors) containing bencoded dictionaries over UDP.

A KRPC message is a single dictionary with two keys common to every message and additional keys depending on the type of message. Every message has a key "t" with a string value representing a transaction ID. This transaction ID is generated by the querying node and is echoed in the response, so responses may be correlated with multiple queries to the same node. The transaction ID should be encoded as a short string of binary numbers, typically two octets are enough as they cover 2^16 outstanding queries. The other key contained in every KRPC message is "y" with a single character value describing the type of message. The value of the "y" key is one of "q" for query, "r" for response, or "e" for error.

==== Queries ====
Queries, or KRPC message dictionaries with a "y" value of "q", contain two additional keys; "q" and "a". Key "q" has a string value containing the method name of the query. Key "a" has a dictionary value containing named arguments to the query.

==== Responses ====
Responses, or KRPC message dictionaries with a "y" value of "r", contain one additional key "r". The value of "r" is a dictionary containing named return values. Response messages are sent upon successful completion of a query.

==== Errors ====
Errors, or KRPC message dictionaries with a "y" value of "e", contain one additional key "e". The value of "e" is a list. The first element is an integer representing the error code. The second element is a string containing the error message. Errors are sent when a query cannot be fulfilled.

== Implementations ==
Mainline DHT was first included in version 4.2.0 of the BitTorrent software (November 2005). Since then, it has been implemented by a number of other clients:

- μTorrent
- Transmission
- rTorrent
- KTorrent
- BitComet
- Deluge
- BitSpirit
- Vuze with the MlDHT plugin
- Shareaza
- Tixati
- qBittorrent
