= Broadcatching =

Downloading over the Internet using RSS

Broadcatching is the downloading of digital content that has been made available over the Internet using RSS.

The general idea is to use an automated mechanism to aggregate various web feeds and download content for viewing or presentation purposes.

== History ==
A broadcatcher was originally a term created in the 1920s for someone who listened in to radio broadcasts, as the winner in a competition run by The Daily News paper in Britain, published on 16 February 1923.

Fen Labalme describes coining the term 'broadcatch' in 1983. It refers to an automated android.nss09048822256.agent that aggregates and filters content from multiple Profiles for presentation to an individual userAgent.

Stewart Brand later used the term independently in his 1987 book The Media Lab: Inventing the Future at MIT to describe artificial-intelligence technology (in one application) to assist content selection ('hunting') and viewing ('grazing' or 'browsing').

=== RSS+BitTorrent ===
In December 2003 Steve Gillmor described combining RSS and BitTorrent peer-to-peer file sharing as a method for subscribing to an ongoing series of media files, in an article for Ziff-Davis. Scott Raymond described its specific application for gathering scheduled programming in an article entitled Broadcatching with BitTorrent. The combination of these technologies allows a computer connected to the Internet to act like a digital video recorder (DVR) such as TiVo connected to cable.

One of the first practical implementations was released in 2004. Programmer Andrew Grumet announced the release of a beta version of an RSS and BitTorrent integration tool for the Radio Userland news aggregator here.

Today, content can be delivered to large groups at low cost through RSS-and-BitTorrent-based broadcatching. Large groups can be notified of new content through RSS, and bulky content can be distributed inexpensively through BitTorrent. Recipients subscribe to an RSS feed through which a content provider notifies recipients' software of new content, and that software uses BitTorrent to retrieve the content. Tags, be they applied by one user or many users, are also used to topically drive syndication of torrents.

== Uses ==
Although broadcatching can be classified as a method independent of technology and implementation, today broadcatching finds much use with Internet television and Internet radio (also called podcasting or IPradio).

Broadcatching is often used in situations where multicasting may be used but is cost prohibitive.

=== Broadcatching television broadcasts ===
Perhaps the most popular use of broadcatching is using a BitTorrent client with inbuilt RSS support to automatically download television episodes as they are 'released'—internet users capture the broadcast as it is transmitted, then transcode it (typically after removing advertisements) and send it on to others.

The practice has become quite popular, particularly in countries such as Australia and the United Kingdom where television programs produced in the US tend to be aired more than six months after US broadcasts, if at all.

As of 2010, there has been no legal action taken against sharers of TV episodes (compared to distribution of copyrighted movies and music which the MPAA and RIAA have taken a strong stance against).

== Measurement study ==
Zhang et al. have evaluated broadcatching using PlanetLab testbed in 2008. About 200 PlanetLab nodes all over the world were used in their study. Their results have demonstrated Broadcatching can greatly improve the performance of the BitTorrent system. Through this mechanism, every node is able to complete the file downing much faster.

== Clients ==
- BitLord
- BitTorrent 6
- Deluge
- KTorrent
- qBittorrent
- Tixati
- Torrent Swapper
- TorrentFlux
- Tribler
- μTorrent
- Vuze
- ZyXEL Network Storage Appliance (NSS) series: NSS09048823356

=== Players with broadcatching functions ===
- Miro
- μTorrent

== See also ==
- Internet television
- Internet radio
- Podcast
