= Super-seeding =

BitTorrent uploading algorithm

In file sharing, super-seeding is an algorithm developed by John Hoffman for the BitTorrent communications protocol that helps downloaders become uploaders more quickly, but it introduces the danger of total seeding failure if there is only one downloader.

The algorithm applies when there is only one seed in the swarm. By permitting each downloader to download largely disjoint parts of the files listed in a torrent, it allows peers to start seeding to each other more quickly. Peers attached to a seed with super-seeding enabled therefore distribute pieces of the torrent file much more readily before they have completed the download themselves.

In 2003, BitTornado became the first BitTorrent client to implement the algorithm.

== Effects ==
Testing by one group found that super seeding can help save an upload ratio of around 20%. It works best when the upload speed of the seed is greater than that of individual peers.

Super seeding transfers stall when there is only one downloading client. The seeders will not send more data until a second client receives the data. To avoid this, rTorrent continues to offer more pieces to the peers without waiting for confirmation, until it is uploading at its configured capacity.

== Supporting clients ==
- BitComet (Feature added in v.1.16. Renamed to Initial-Seeding in v.1.17.)
- BitTorrent version 6.0
- Deluge since version 2.00
- Halite
- KTorrent 4.1
- libtorrent
- qBittorrent version 2.0.0
- rTorrent version 0.8.2
- Tixati since version 1.34
- μTorrent (Named "Initial Seeding")
- Vuze (formerly Azureus)
