= BiglyBT =

BitTorrent client

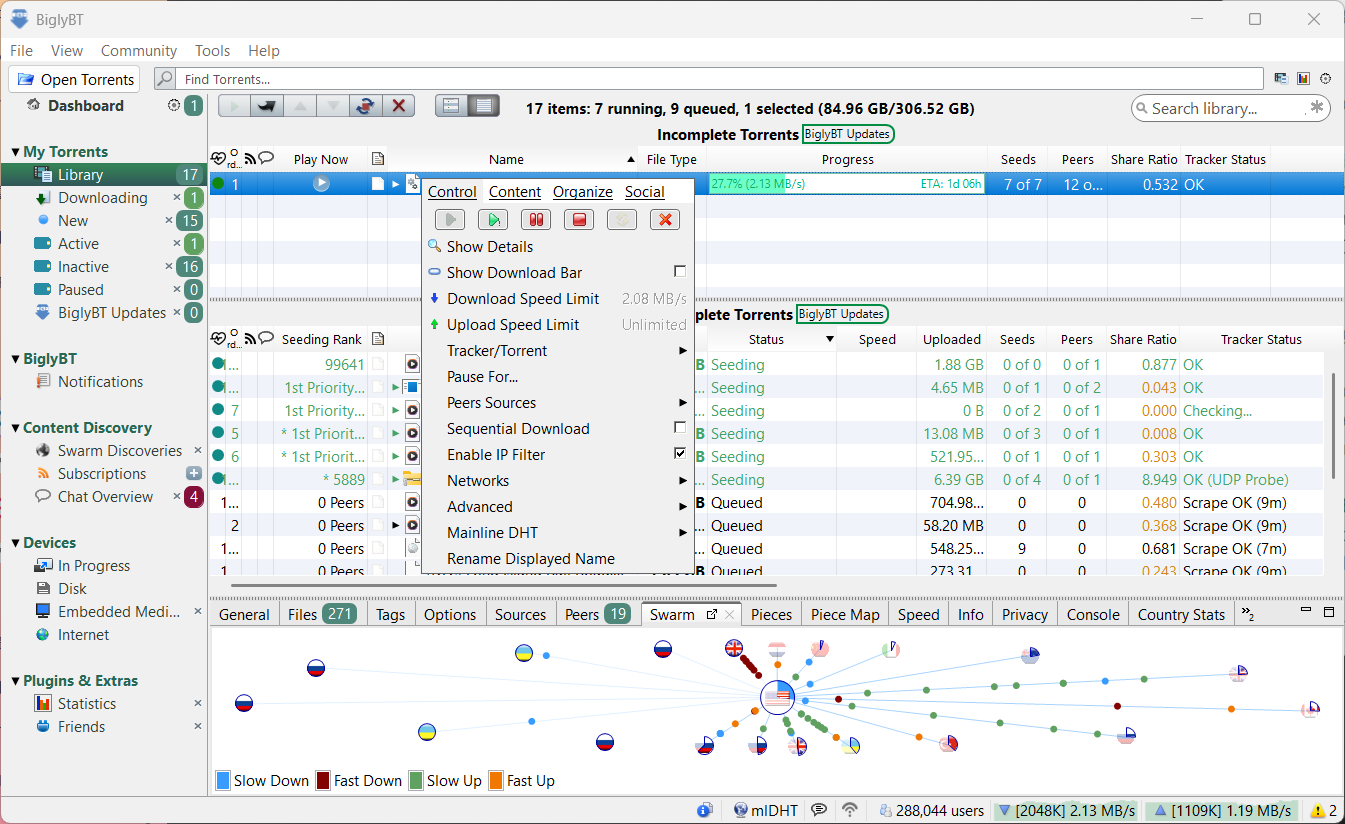
- Original authors: parg; TuxPaper
- Developer: Bigly Software
- Release: 27 July 2017
- Stable release: 4.0.0.0 / 19 December 2025
- Written in: Java
- Platform: Java; Android; Android TV
- License: GPLv2 or later
- Website: www.biglybt.com/features.php
- Repository: github.com/BiglySoftware/BiglyBT

BiglyBT is a BitTorrent client written in Java forked from Vuze. It is free and open-source software and ad-free.

== Features ==
BiglyBT has most of the features of Vuze, its predecessor. However, it lacks Vuze's premium and proprietary features and features the developers considered bloat, including DVD burning, gaming promotions, the video-sharing content network, and the installer's advertisements. Some removed features such as the embedded media player, RSS scanner, and iTunes integration are available via downloadable plugins.

BiglyBT's features include swarm merging, using different torrents to download the same file; limiting download/upload speeds by tag, peer-set (e.g. country), network (public or I2P), and individual peer; detecting and integrating with VPNs; support for the I2P network; remote control with any Android app that supports Transmission's RPC protocol; and "robust settings". Many of these features are included via bundled plugins.

== History ==
Development of Vuze ground to a halt in early 2017, with no new releases or commits being made since April, featured content from the content network becoming inaccessible, and users reporting outdated antivirus definitions. The two main developers, parg and TuxPaper, left the project and focused their efforts on an ad-free fork called BiglyBT with goals of shedding commercial interests. They proceeded to remove Vuze's premium and proprietary features and license the entire project under the GNU General Public License.

In December 2017, after pushing an update for review, the Android version of BiglyBT was rejected from Google Play for mentioning "other brands: Bittorrent" in the app listing's description, surprising the developers. The app was restored to Google Play after all mentions of "BitTorrent" were replaced with "torrent".

Version 2.5—released 22 September 2020—added support for version 2 of the BitTorrent protocol, making it the first BitTorrent client to do so. The updated protocol features improved checksums, including per-file hashes that allow improved swarm merging. libtorrent, a BitTorrent library used by popular clients such as qBittorrent and μTorrent Web but not BiglyBT, implemented the functionality a few weeks prior (with version 2.0, released 7 September 2020), but clients that use the library had yet to incorporate the functionality as of BiglyBT's update.

== Reception ==
In April 2020, TorrentFreak named BiglyBT the tenth popular BitTorrent client with 0.3% of the market share.

Reviewers noted the higher amount of computer resource consumption due to using Java and appreciated the amount of features, praising the swarm merging feature and amount of options. Whitson Gordon of PCMag described BiglyBT as "Features Galore, If You Want Them".
