= RTorrent =

BitTorrent library and text-based client

rTorrent
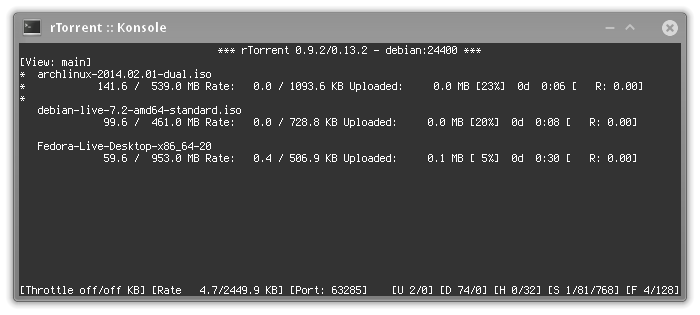
- The main information screen for rTorrent and libTorrent (rTorrent v0.9.2)
- Developer: Jari Sundell (a.k.a. rakshasa)
- Initial release: 25 January 2005; 21 years ago
- Stable release: 0.16.11 / 1 May 2026; 6 days ago
- Written in: C++
- Operating system: Unix-like
- Platform: IA-32, x86-64
- Size: 1.3 MiB
- Type: BitTorrent client
- License: GPL-2.0-or-later (Note: GPL-2.0-or-later with OpenSSL exception)
- Website: rakshasa.github.io/rtorrent/
- Repository: github.com/rakshasa/rtorrent

rTorrent is a text-based BitTorrent client written in C++, based on the ncurses and libTorrent (not to be confused with libtorrent) libraries for Unix.

== Technical details ==
The library differentiates itself from other implementations by transferring data directly between file pages mapped to memory by the mmap() function and the network stack. On high-bandwidth connections, it claims to be able to seed at three times the speed of the official client.

rTorrent packages are available for various Linux distributions and Unix-like systems, and it will compile and run on nearly every POSIX-compliant operating system, such as FreeBSD and macOS.

rTorrent uses the ncurses library and is suitable for use with GNU Screen or Tmux; it uses commands such as Carriage return to load a torrent, after which ^S can be used to start a torrent (where ^ is shorthand for Ctrl key), backspace can be used to automatically start a torrent once it is loaded, making a subsequent issue of ^S unnecessary, ^K for stop, and ^D for pause, or if already paused or stopped, ^D again to delete the torrent. It supports saving of sessions and allows the user to add and remove torrents. It also supports partial downloading of multi-file torrents. In the release of rTorrent-0.7.0 support for BitTorrent protocol encryption was also implemented. PEX, DHT and initial seeding were recently implemented in rTorrent.

rTorrent can be controlled via XML-RPC over SCGI; support for JSON-RPC was merged upstream in version 0.15.2 and later. Benchmarking shows that JSON-RPC delivers a twofold performance improvement and reduces total client CPU usage by about 15%.

== See also ==
- Comparison of BitTorrent clients
