= Bitflu =

- Developer: Adrian Ulrich
- Initial release: 2009
- Stable release: 1.52 / July 11, 2015; 10 years ago
- Written in: Perl
- Operating system: Unix-like
- Available in: English
- Type: BitTorrent client
- License: Artistic License 2.0
- Website: bitflu.workaround.ch

Bitflu is an open-source, BitTorrent client by Adrian Ulrich. It is available for Unix-like systems and is written in Perl.

== Features ==
- Multiple downloads
- IPv6 Support
- Designed to run as a daemon/No GUI: You can connect to the client via telnet and/or http (AJAX)
- Security: The client can chroot itself and drop privileges
- Bandwidth shaping (upload+download)
- Crash-Proof design: Crashes or a full filesystem will never corrupt your downloads again :-)
- Non-Threading/Non-Forking: All connections are handled in non-blocking state using epoll (or kqueue on *BSD)

== Reception ==
Bitflu has received good reviews, both in open-source software sites and blogs, praising it for being lightweight and feature-complete.

Even so, Bitflu seems to be largely unknown, reportedly commanding only 0.000025% of the total BitTorrent traffic. According to one reviewer, this could be due to its non-automated, relatively elaborated install procedure, which could be putting off a "majority of users who can't do anything more complicated than a click-next-until-finish install".

== See also ==
- Comparison of BitTorrent clients
