= Multipurpose Transaction Protocol =

- Developer(s): Data Expedition, Inc.
- Stable release: 4.5.2 / August 18, 2025
- Written in: C
- Operating system: Cross-platform
- Type: Protocol (computing)
- License: Commercial
- Website: https://www.dataexpedition.com/

Multipurpose Transaction Protocol (MTP) software is a proprietary transport protocol (OSI Layer 4) developed and marketed by Data Expedition, Inc. (DEI). DEI claims that MTP offers superior performance and reliability when compared to the Transmission Control Protocol (TCP) transport protocol.

== General ==
MTP is implemented using the User Datagram Protocol (UDP) packet format. It uses proprietary flow-control and error-correction algorithms to achieve reliable delivery of data and avoid network flooding.

== Compatibility ==
Because MTP/IP uses proprietary algorithms, compatible software must be installed on both ends of a communication path. Use of the UDP packet format permits compatibility with standard Internet Protocol (IP) network hardware and software. MTP/IP applications may use any available UDP port number.

MTP and the applications which use it have been implemented for several operating systems, including versions of Microsoft Windows, macOS, iOS, and Linux. Hardware platforms include variants of x86 and ARM.

== Availability ==
MTP/IP is marketed by Data Expedition, Inc. Trial versions of applications which use MTP/IP are available on the company's website.

== See also ==
- Internet protocol suite
- Micro Transport Protocol (μTP)
- QUIC (Quick UDP Internet Connections)
- Stream Control Transmission Protocol (SCTP UDP Encapsulation; RFC 6951)
