= Tuotu =

Tuotu (脫兔), (Rabbit in Chinese), like Thunder by Xunlei, is software that provides a peer-to-peer file sharing service and download accelerating services. It is gaining popularity in mainland China and Malaysia. It supports BitTorrent, ED2K, KAD, HTTP, FTP, MMS, RTSP file-transfer protocols.
