= MonoTorrent =

- Developer(s): Alan McGovern
- Initial release: April 25, 2007; 18 years ago
- Stable release: 3.0.2 / 4 August 2024
- Preview release: v3.0.0 beta 159 (February 1, 2023; 2 years ago) [±]
- Repository: github.com/alanmcgovern/monotorrent
- Written in: C#
- Operating system: Cross-platform
- Available in: English
- Type: BitTorrent library
- License: MIT
- Website: github.com/mono/monotorrent

MonoTorrent is a cross-platform .NET Standard 2.0 compatible library which implements the BitTorrent protocol. As a result, MonoTorrent can be compiled and executed on every major operating system, including smart phones, IoT or other mobile devices.

The aim of this library is not to provide a rich graphical interface for users to interact with, but rather to provide a rich programming API to allow a developer to create a GUI using the library without having to worry about reinventing the wheel by implementing the BitTorrent specification themselves.

As a result, this should allow developers to embed the library into a wide variety of applications with ease.

The library was initially developed under the 2006 Google Summer of Code. It now resides in the public Git repository for Mono.

== See also ==
- Comparison of BitTorrent libraries
