= Free Download Manager =

Download manager for Windows, Linux and macOS

- Free Download Manager 6.2.4 in Windows 10
- Developer: SoftDeluxe
- Release: 2004; 22 years ago
- Stable release: 6.30.3.6518 / 31 October 2025; 12 months ago
- Written in: C++
- Operating system: Windows, macOS, Linux (.deb) and Android
- Platform: Hardware: IA-32 and x64 Software: Internet Explorer, Google Chrome, Opera, Mozilla Firefox, Netscape, Apple Safari, SeaMonkey
- Size: Varies with the devices
- Available in: 30 languages
- List of languages Albanian, Arabic, Brazilian Bulgarian, Chinese Chinese, Croatian, Czech, Dutch, French, German, Greek, Hebrew, Hungarian, Italian, Korean, Macedonian, Persian Polish, Portuguese, Portuguese-Brazil, Romanian, Russian, Serbian, Slovak, Slovenian, Spanish, Swedish, Traditional, Turkish, Uzbek, Vietnamese.
- Type: Download manager, BitTorrent client & Productivity software
- License: Freeware
- Website: www.freedownloadmanager.org
- Repository: sourceforge.net/p/freedownload/code/HEAD/tree/

Free Download Manager is a download manager for Windows, macOS, Linux and Android.

Free Download Manager is proprietary software, but was free and open-source software between versions 2.5 and 3.9.7. Starting with version 3.0.852 (15 April 2010), the source code was made available in the project's Subversion repository instead of being included with the binary package. This continued until version 3.9.7. The source code for version 5.0 and newer is not available and the GNU General Public License agreement has been removed from the app.

The ability to download YouTube videos was included in the program's functionality until October 16, 2021, when one of the developers, Alex, indicated that Google had filed a complaint report, requesting the option be disabled. Attempts to download any videos from YouTube currently result in the message, "Youtube downloads are not available" being shown in the download box. A resolution with Google's legal team still has yet to be reached.

== Features ==
- The GUI presents several tabs that organize types of downloads and allow access to different features in the program.
- Download information view that shows each download's progress bar, file preview, community opinions if any are written for that download and a log showing connection status.
- Download acceleration
- Dropbox for file drag-and-drop
- HTTP and FTP download support
- Enhanced audio/video files support
- RTSP/MMS download support
- Batch downloading support for downloading a set of files
- Segmented file transfer: Splits large file into parts (specified in the settings of the software) and downloads simultaneously
- BitTorrent support (based on Libtorrent), Magnet URI scheme support
- Flash Video download from sites like Google Video (exclude Android)
- Resuming broken downloads, if permitted by the server
- Zip files partial download, lets users download only the necessary part of a zip file.
- Simultaneous downloading from several mirrors
- Support bandwidth throttling via three fully customizable traffic modes: low, medium, and high.
- Import list of URLs from clipboard
- Integrates with the browser being used to track URL or Copy functions if downloadable content is found
- Remote control via the Internet
- Smart file management and powerful scheduler
- Portable mode, users can easily create its portable version and avoid the need to install and configure the program on each computer.
- Active Spyware and Adware protection using active communication among users and also through installed Antivirus software on the computer.

== Tabs ==
- Downloads – This is the program's focal point, simply a download manager. Users can also create groups with folders to which files with specific extensions will be downloaded.
- Flash video downloads – This feature helps users to download FLV video files from Google Video and many other sites.
- Torrents – Allows downloading of torrent files
- Scheduler – Users can create and manage lists of tasks to be executed at a preset time. Tasks include launching external programs, starting and stopping downloads, and shutting down the computer in all possible ways.
- Site Explorer – This feature is an FTP client.
- Site Manager – This feature allows users to tell FDM how to act with specific sites, such as websites that require authentication, or how many download connections a website can accept simultaneously from the user.
- HTML Spider – This feature can download a website by following and downloading links recursively.

== Malware on official website ==
It was found that the website freedownloadmanager.org was spreading Linux malware for over three years until 2022. Researchers discovered that the site was intermittently redirecting users to domains that served a malicious version of the Free Download Manager software. This malware included a script that installed a backdoor on Linux devices to steal passwords, browsing history, cryptocurrency wallet files, and cloud service credentials. The infection was uncovered in September 2023 though it had been active since 2020. It is believed to have been a supply chain attack impacting the legitimate Free Download Manager project. The malware went undetected for years due to the stealthy nature of Linux threats compared to Windows. The administrators of the site responded to notifications about the campaign.

== See also ==
- BitTorrent client
- Comparison of file sharing applications
- Comparison of download managers
- Comparison of BitTorrent clients
