= Xunlei =

Chinese multinational technology company

Xunlei Limited
- Company type: Public company
- Traded as: Nasdaq: XNET
- Industry: Internet, multimedia
- Founded: 2003; 23 years ago
- Founder: Sean Shenglong Zou
- Headquarters: Shenzhen, China
- Area served: Worldwide
- Number of employees: 1513 (2014)

Xunlei Limited
- Simplified Chinese: 深圳市迅雷网络技术有限公司
- Traditional Chinese: 深圳市迅雷網絡技術有限公司
- Literal meaning: Shenzhen Xunlei Networking Technologies, Co., Ltd.
Transcriptions
Standard Mandarin
- Hanyu Pinyin: Shēnzhènshì Xùnléi Wǎngluòjìshù Yǒuxiàngōngsī
Yue: Cantonese
- Jyutping: sam1 zan3 si5 seon3 leoi4 mong5 lok3 gei6 seot6 jau5 haan6 gung1 si1

Xunlei Limited (Chinese: 迅雷; pinyin: Xùnléi; Jyutping: seon3 leoi4; lit. 'thunderbolt') is a Chinese multinational technology company and an online service provider founded in 2003. The subsidiary of Xunlei Limited, Shenzhen Xunlei Networking Technologies, Co., Ltd. (Chinese: 迅雷网络技术有限公司) was formerly known as Sandai Technologies (Shenzhen) Inc. and changed its name to Shenzhen Xunlei Networking Technologies, Co., Ltd. in May 2005. Its headquarters are in Nanshan District, Shenzhen.

In April 2014, Xunlei received an investment from a Chinese electronics company Xiaomi of $200 million. On 24 June 2014, it went public on the Nasdaq Stock Exchange, selling 7.315 million American depositary shares (ADS) at $12 and raising just shy of $88 million. According to the annual ranking of China's top 100 internet companies released by Ministry of Industry and Information Technology of the Chinese government, Xunlei occupied 42nd place in 2017's ranking.

The main products developed by Xunlei Limited is the Xunlei download manager and Peer-to-peer software, supporting HTTP, FTP, eDonkey, and BitTorrent protocols. As of 2010, it was the most commonly used BitTorrent client in the world. In October 2017, the company announced that it will transform itself into a blockchain company, and release a blockchain-based product named OneThing Cloud. OneThing Cloud users get LinkToken (a type of virtual token) for contributing their bandwidth to the Xunlei's content delivery network.

Xunlei Ltd. announced that its board of directors has appointed Lei Chen, who is a former Tencent cloud computing unit leader, as its chief executive officer of the company and director of the board on 29 June 2017. On 12 December 2017, Xunlei announced that the board of directors of the company has elected Mr. Chuan Wang as the chairman of board of directors of the company. Wang has been a director of Xunlei since March 2014. Wang is a co-founder of Xiaomi Inc., where he has served as its vice president since 2012. He is also the founder of Beijing Duokan Technology Co., Ltd., where he has served as its chief executive officer since its inception of business in 2010.

== Products ==
Xunlei
- Developer: Thunder Networking Technologies (a.k.a. Xunlei Networking Technologies)
Stable release
- Windows: /
- macOS: 5.0.2.65551 / 16 June 2022; 4 years ago
- iOS: 1.5.8 / 29 September 2022; 3 years ago
- Android: 7.53.0.8245 / 11 October 2022; 3 years ago
- Operating system: Microsoft Windows, macOS, Android, iOS
- Size: 32.23 MB (Windows)
- Available in: Simplified Chinese, Traditional Chinese, English with a language pack
- Type: Peer-to-peer file sharing
- License: Closed source adware
- Website: xunlei.com

The Xunlei download manager, generally called Xunlei, is the flagship product of Xunlei Corporation and other desktop software. Xunlei is the most popular download software in China. Since 2017, StellarCloud, OneThing Cloud and ThunderChain have become important products of the corporation.

=== Xunlei ===
Through Xunlei, users can access a large portion of the files available on the Internet. Xunlei uses a technology called P2SP to speed up download. Features in Xunlei includes a built-in browser, changeable skins, cloud storage, "offline" downloading, hi-speed downloading (only available for members), email service and more. According to iResearch's report, as of March 2014, the cloud accelerates monthly active users of Xunlei reach 142 million (including approximately 5.2 million paid members), and has a market share of 81.4% in the cloud accelerated products and services market in China.

Xunlei is accompanied by a family of products including Xunlei 9, Mac Xunlei, Xunlei VIP Edition, and Xunlei Express Edition. As adware, Xunlei products feature banner advertisements, which can be disabled if logged in as a VIP user.

=== Nebula CDN ===
Nebula (Chinese: 星域; lit. 'asteroid field') CDN is a content delivery/distribution network (CDN) product which launched by Shenzhen Onething Technologies Co., Ltd, a wholly owned subsidiary of Xunlei, in June 2015. Different from traditional CDN, Nebula CDN make use of idle bandwidth that share by users. In order to participate in this plan, users can buy a network device (ZhuanQianBao or OneThing Cloud) from Xunlei. In return, Xunlei gives the user virtual token as a reward. As the civil broadband prices far below the broadband prices for enterprises in China, Nebula CDN's enterprise-side prices lower than its competitors. The business customers of Nebula CDN include Xiaomi, iQiyi, Momo, Insta360, Bilibili and Xunlei itself. In August 2017, Xunlei announced they received an official license of CDN operating from Ministry of industry and information industry of China.

=== StellarCloud ===
StellarCloud (Chinese: 星域云) is a shared cloud computing platform which expands Xunlei's existing content delivery network (CDN) services to Infrastructure as a Service (IaaS), offering edge computing, function computing and shared CDN (SCDN) solutions. StellarCloud is created to help companies in their transition to cloud, including content delivery, live streaming, data storage and artificial intelligence (AI). Supported by over 1.5 million computing nodes, StellarCloud can offer as much as 30T bandwidth capacity and 1500 PB storage capacity.

=== OneThing Cloud ===
OneThingCloud (Chinese: 玩客云), a private cloud designed for people who pursue high quality digital entertainment, provides people with quick download, instant storage and removing, file management, remote control, multimedia entertainment and other functions.

=== ThunderChain ===
In April 2018, Xunlei launched ThunderChain (Chinese: 迅雷链), a high-performance blockchain platform, which can concurrently conduct millions of transactions per second (TPS). Based on Xunlei's proprietary homogeneous multichain framework, ThunderChain is designed to realize confirmation and interaction among homogeneous chains and enable multiple transactions to be executed on different chains in parallel. An optimized practical Byzantine fault tolerance (PBFT) is adopted by ThunderChain as its consensus model which results in low latency and makes it possible to generate one block per second. PBFT, as a consistency algorithm, is also able to avoid soft fork. ThunderChain supports smart contracts written in solidity language and is compatible with Ethereum Virtual Machine (EVM), making it easy to migrate applications from other blockchain platforms.

=== ThunderChain File System ===
ThunderChain File System (TCFS), based on Xunlei's proprietary distributed technology and millions of shared computing nodes, is a distributed file system for data storage and authorized distribution. It is built specifically for blockchain platforms including ThunderChain and other platforms. Blockchain developers and enterprises can build decentralized applications (DApps) with distributed data storage and integration, possessing the improved capabilities in openness, transparency, non-temper ability, traceability, reliability, security and encryption, mass storage and authorization.

=== Xunlei Kankan ===
Xunlei Kankan, also known as Kankan, is a video-on-demand service with a web interface as well as a client application. Xunlei Kankan is also available on mobile platforms including Android and iOS (including iPhone and Kankan HD for iPad). In 2015, Xunlei sold its entire stake in Xunlei Kankan to Beijing Nesound International Media Corp., Ltd. for a total consideration of RMB 130 million.

=== Others ===
In addition to the above products, the company also produces software such as a media player, a game accelerator, a live streaming video platform and online games.

== Facilities ==
=== Headquarters and offices ===
Xunlei Building, the new headquarters building of Xunlei, is under construction and expected to be completed in 2020. Xunlei Building is located in Shenzhen Nanshan District, adjacent to Shenzhen Metro Line 1 and Line 2. The building has 30 floors, and the total construction area of the building is about 65,000 square meters.

== Concerns and criticisms ==
=== LinkToken ===
LinkToken, formerly known as OneCoin, is one kind of virtual token issued by Xunlei, and this token must be obtained through the sharing of user's network bandwidth, storage space or other resources. Xunlei said this token can be used to pay for network acceleration services, cloud storage services and other internet content. The company explained that the digital token would allow transparent bookkeeping for the computing resources that users share on the company's cloud platform. On account of the prohibition of virtual currency trading and initial coin offering (ICO) in China, Xunlei declare that LinkToken does not constitute an ICO and it cannot be purchased or traded in cash, and the company has issued lawyer's letters to third-party trading platforms, requiring them to stop LinkToken trading activities. Nevertheless, the trading price of the token still rose 30 times in a month on some unofficial trading platforms, and some critics assert that the token is too speculative and may face some regulatory risks.

On 17 September 2018, Xunlei entered into a strategic partnership with Newland Hi-Tech Group Co., Ltd. In connection with the Strategic Partnership, Xunlei also entered into a series of transactions with Beijing LinkChain Co., Ltd., an associated company of Newland, to transfer the exclusive right to operate LinkToken program within mainland China, including without limitation, the formulation, amendment and execution of the rules governing the rewarding of LinkToken to users, LinkToken Pocket and the LinkToken Mall, and the related assets and liabilities to Beijing LinkChain (the "Transfer"). Upon the completion of this Transfer, Xunlei will cease operating the LinkToken program within mainland China. This Transfer will allow Xunlei to put more focus on research and development of the underlying blockchain technology and infrastructure, such as ThunderChain and ThunderChain File System (TCFS).

=== File sharing ===
Xunlei is different from P2P tools in that it does not support active file sharing. While copyright advocates view Xunlei as a P2P tool that facilitates copyright violation, P2P advocates criticize Xunlei as a leech with much more downloading than uploading. Also it is often observed that Xunlei prioritizes file sharing with Xunlei users rather than other client users. Many pure P2P tools have blocked Xunlei, although this trend weakened after Xunlei began balancing the number of downloads and uploads.

Xunlei sets up its own storage servers to backup the files which are not active or shared any longer. This feature is named as High-Speed Channel and allows Xunlei users retrieve data faster than others. But only purchased users have rights to access to these servers and download files.

== See also ==
- Tencent
- FlashGet, another download manager
