= Miro (video software) =

Internet television software

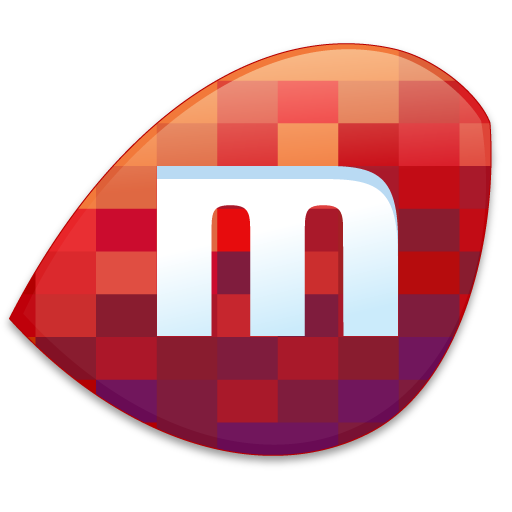

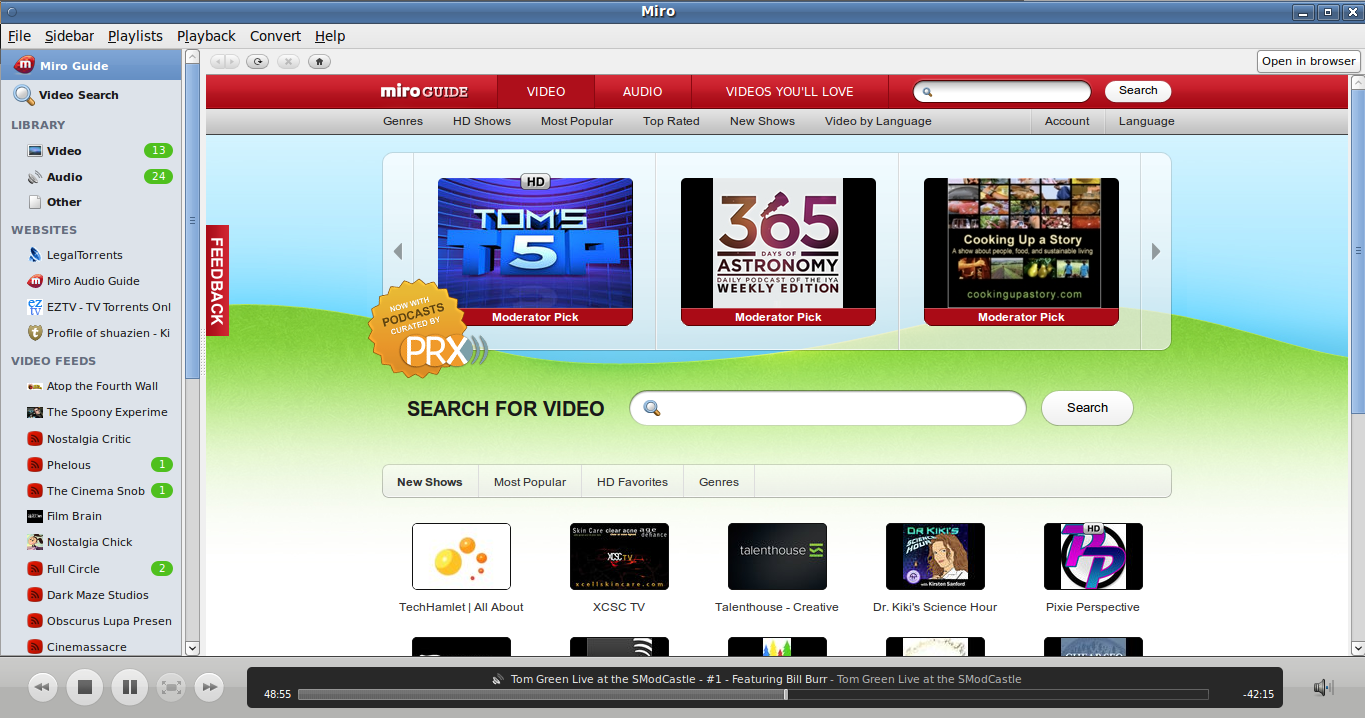
- Miro 3.5 running on Ubuntu, showing the Miro guide in the main window while playing a podcast.
- Developer: Participatory Culture Foundation
- Release: 21 February 2006; 20 years ago
- Final release: 6.0 / 5 April 2013; 13 years ago
- Written in: Python using GTK+
- Operating system: Windows, macOS, Linux
- Size: Windows: 28.50 MB; macOS: 15.28 MB; Linux: 2.0 MB; Source code: 9.28 MB
- Available in: 40 languages
- Type: Media player Internet television RSS+BitTorrent
- License: GPL-2.0-or-later
- Website: getmiro.com
- Repository: github.com/pculture/miro

Miro (formerly named Democracy Player or DTV) was an audio, video player and Internet television application released by the Participatory Culture Foundation in 2006. Miro could automatically download videos from RSS-based "channels", manage them and play them. The application was designed to mesh with other Participatory Culture Foundation (PCF) products such as Video Bomb, a social tagging video website, and the Channel Channel, a TV guide for Internet television.

Miro ran on Microsoft Windows, macOS, FreeBSD and Linux and supported most common video file formats. It offered both audio and video, some in HD quality. The separate Miro Video Converter converted video formats. It was based on FFmpeg with profiles for the Theora (.ogv), .mp4, and WebM video formats supported by various devices.

Miro is free software, released under the terms of the GPL-2.0-or-later. The Participatory Culture Foundation no longer develops Miro. The last version (6.0) was released in 2013 and is no longer functioning correctly because of changes to the YouTube API.

== History ==
The application was first launched in 2005 as Democracy Player (sometimes abbreviated as DTV) and later on as Miro in 2007. Video searching of web-based video archives was included in 2007, with access to various archives changing over time.

Miro is mostly written in Python, although it links to various libraries written in a variety of languages. Versions through 2.x had an almost entirely HTML/CSS based UI. Miro uses embedded WebKit in a GTK window on Unix/Linux (Mozilla Gecko/XUL until 3.0.2), WebKit in a Cocoa window on macOS, and Mozilla in a XUL window on Windows. Since version 3.0, the macOS port uses Cocoa and others use GTK. The embedded web browser is used only for web pages.

== Reception ==
Miro received a favorable review from Josh Quittner who wrote "I have seen the future of television and it’s an application called Miro." In May 2011, Seth Rosenblatt of CNET wrote, "Providing one-stop shopping for all your video and audio management desires, open-source and cross-platform Miro deserves much of the praise that's been heaped upon it."

== See also ==
- Broadcatching
- Peercasting
- Popcorn Time, a similar media player
- Open Media Network
