= Tribler =

Peer-to-peer filesharing software and protocol

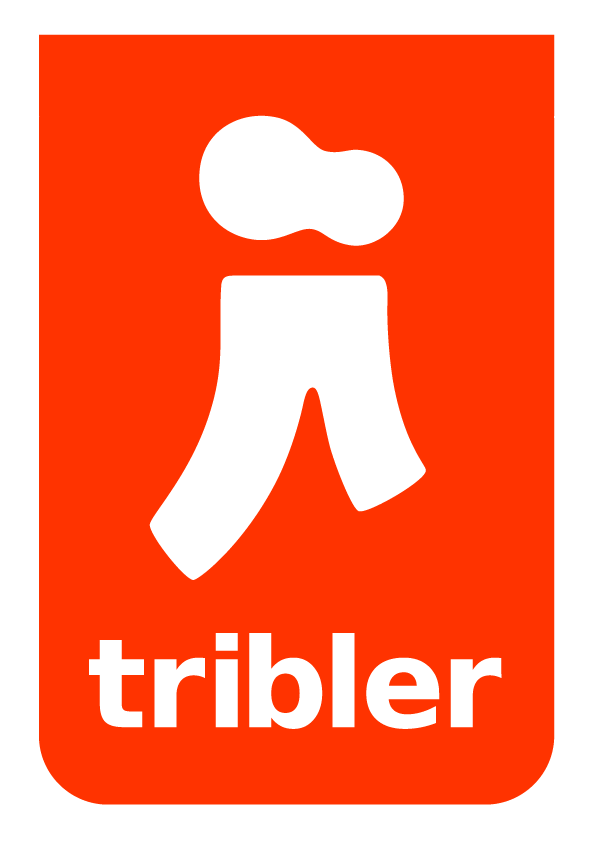

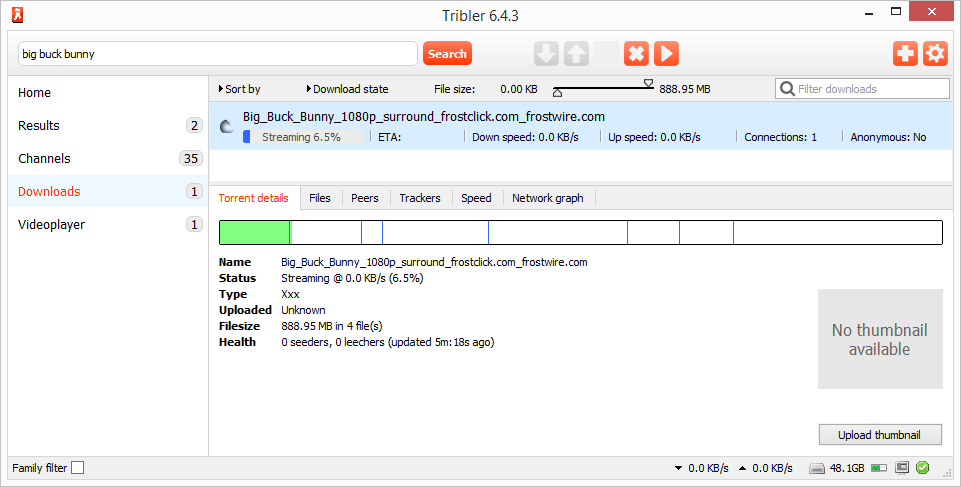
- Tribler 6.4.3 (2016)
- Developer(s): The Tribler Team at Delft University of Technology and VU University Amsterdam
- Initial release: 28 February 2006; 19 years ago
- Stable release: 8.0.7 / 16 December 2024; 8 months ago
- Repository: github.com/Tribler/tribler
- Written in: Python
- Operating system: Microsoft Windows, OS X, Linux
- Platform: ARM, IA-32, MIPS, PowerPC, x86-64
- Size: 110.58 MiB
- Available in: English
- Type: BitTorrent client
- License: GPL-3.0-only
- Website: www.tribler.org

Tribler is an open source decentralized BitTorrent client which allows anonymous peer-to-peer by default. Tribler is based on the BitTorrent protocol and uses an overlay network for content searching. Due to this overlay network, Tribler does not require an external website or indexing service to discover content. The user interface of Tribler is very basic and focused on ease of use instead of diversity of features. Tribler is available for Linux, Windows, and OS X.

Tribler has run trials for a video streamer known as SwarmPlayer.

== History ==
The name Tribler stems from the word tribe, referring to the usage of social networks in this P2P client. The first version of Tribler was an enhancement of ABC aka Yet Another BitTorrent Client.

In 2009, the development team behind Tribler stated that their efforts for the coming years were focused on the integration of Tribler with television hardware.

In 2014, with the release of version 6.3.1, a custom built-in onion routing network was introduced as part of Tribler. Users can load any clearnet torrent, and by leaving the box for anonymity ticked, the files will be routed through other Tribler. Because the custom onion network does not use Tor exit nodes, it is enhanced to make every Tribler user to function as a relay.

== Features ==
Tribler adds keyword search ability to the BitTorrent file download protocol using a gossip protocol, somewhat similar to the eXeem network which was shut down in 2005. The software includes the ability to recommend content. After a dozen downloads the Tribler software can roughly estimate the download taste of the user and recommends content. This feature is based on collaborative filtering, also featured on websites such as Last.fm and Amazon.com. Another feature of Tribler is a limited form of social networking and donation of upload capacity. Tribler borrows bandwidth capacity from connected nodes regarded as helpful to boost the download speed of files.

=== SwarmPlayer ===
The SwarmPlayer is a Python-based BitTorrent Internet TV viewer. It allows one to watch BitTorrent-hosted peer-to-peer digital media distribution of video on demand and plays live Tribler streaming media. It is based on the same core as the Tribler TV application.

The core software is free and open source software based on the Tribler platform, licensed under the LGPL 2.1.

== Development ==
Tribler was created by university researchers at the Delft University of Technology, who are trying to improve peer-to-peer technology. Tribler is designed to enhance BitTorrent by removing the need for central elements such as the websites for finding content, as well as being anonymous.

The European Union's P2P-Next project to develop an Internet television distribution standard builds on Tribler technology.

== Reception ==
After a news article on TorrentFreak in February 2012 mentioned Tribler's decentralization and the fact that its index is impossible to take down, the website became hugely popular, causing it to be reduced to just the download page to satisfy demand. A warning about Tribler security appeared on the tor-dev mailing list on Dec. 20, 2014 and was addressed shortly thereafter via GitHub.. Daniel Aleksandersen has pointed out in 2021 some privacy concerns due to the project's goals and priorities. He considers these issues are still not addressed in 2023.

== See also ==
- Comparison of BitTorrent clients
- GNUnet an active project for peer-to-peer filesharing. In opposition of Tribler, GNUnet uses a mesh network topology (over TCP, UDP, HTTP, HTTPS, WLAN or Bluetooth) and provides chat and VPN features.
- Hyphanet an active project sharing same goal of privacy-friendly peer-to-peer filesharing. Hyphanet has also been designed for censorship-resistant communications.
