= KTorrent =

Free and open source BitTorrent client

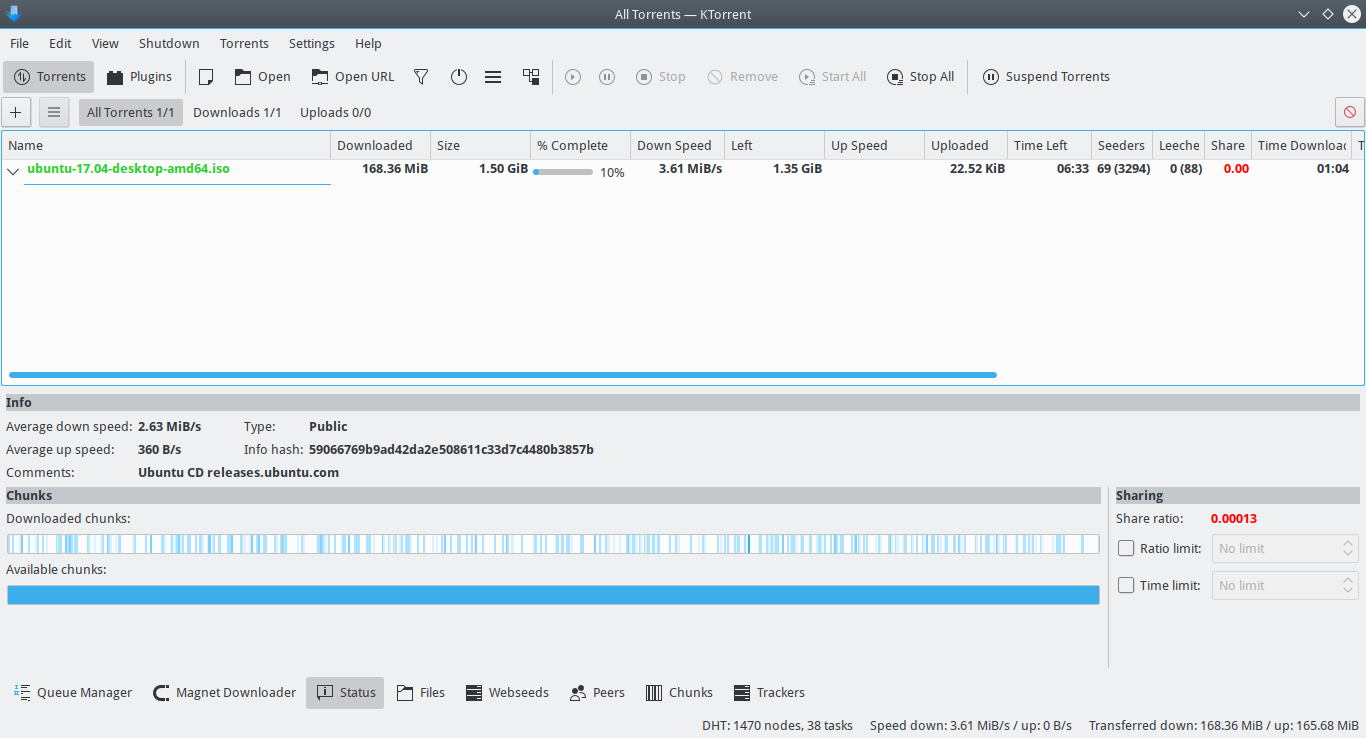
- KTorrent downloading.
- Developers: Joris Guisson, Ivan Vasić
- Stable release: 25.08.0 / 14 August 2025; 4 months ago
- Repository: invent.kde.org/network/ktorrent
- Written in: C++
- Operating system: Unix-like
- Type: BitTorrent client
- License: GPL-2.0-or-later
- Website: kde.org/applications/internet/ktorrent/

KTorrent is a free and open-source BitTorrent client developed by the KDE community. It is designed to integrate with the KDE desktop environment and provides a graphical interface for downloading and seeding torrents on Unix-like systems. It is a part of KDE Gear.

KTorrent is distributed within the wider KDE applications collection and is typically released alongside other KDE software in the project's regular application releases.

== History and development ==
KTorrent began as a KDE-native BitTorrent client and has been maintained by community contributors over time. The application is written in C++ and uses KDE Frameworks and Qt for its interface and integration features.

The core BitTorrent functionality is provided by the libktorrent library, which separates protocol logic from the user interface and enables reuse of the engine in related KDE components.

== Features ==
KTorrent is often received as a client intended to be feature rich. Features include:

- Upload and download speed capping / throttling & scheduling
- Internet searching with torrent search engines.
- Support for UDP trackers.
- IP address blocklist plugin
- Port forwarding with UPnP (Universal Plug and Play)
- Protocol encryption
- DHT (mainline version), and support for trackerless torrents
- μTorrent peer exchange (PEX) support
- File Prioritization
- Ability to import partially downloaded files
- Directory scanner to automatically watch directories for new torrents
- Manual addition of trackers to torrents
- RSS feed support
- Web interface plugin with default port number 8080
- IPv6 support
- SOCKS v4 and v5 support
- μTP support
- Generation and parsing of magnet links
- UDP tracker scraping
- Enhanced usability of the queue manager
- Super-seeding support
- Streaming of video while downloading

=== Plugin system ===
KTorrent includes a plugin architecture that can extend functionality. Depending on version and distribution packaging, plugins may provide RSS-based downloading, search integration, or remote-control options.

== Availability ==
KTorrent is available through the package repositories of many Linux distributions. It is also listed and distributed through KDE's official application channels.

The platform is available through:

- Debian package
- Ubuntu package information (example):

== See also ==
- KGet
- qBittorrent
- Comparison of BitTorrent software
