= FlashGet =

Freeware download manager for Windows

- FlashGet 1.9.1012 running on Windows Vista
- Original author: 侯延堂 (Chinese)
- Developer: Trend Media Co. Ltd.
- Stable release: 3.7.0.1220 / 17 May 2013; 12 years ago
- Preview release: None [±]
- Operating system: Microsoft Windows
- Type: Download manager, BitTorrent client
- License: Proprietary freeware
- Website: www.flashget.com

FlashGet (formerly JetCar, from the literal translation of the Chinese name 快车; Kuàichē) was a freeware download manager for Microsoft Windows. It was originally available in either paid or ad-supported versions, the latter of which included an Internet Explorer Browser Helper Object (BHO).

== Features ==
FlashGet can be integrated with web browsers such as Avant Browser, Google Chrome, Internet Explorer, Opera, Netscape, Mozilla, Mozilla Firefox, Maxthon and SeaMonkey. It can download a sequence of files and it can download a file from multiple locations. It can split files to download into sections, and download each section simultaneously. It has an integrated offline reader. It supports HTTP, FTP, Microsoft Media Services, RTSP, BitTorrent and since version 1.8.4 eDonkey downloads.

== Malware concerns ==
FlashGet has suffered from security flaws in its update mechanism which caused users to become infected with trojan viruses.

There is also some concern about FlashGet downloading every file indicated by its FGUpdate3.ini file that is downloaded from the developer every time FlashGet is started. A malicious FGUpdate3.ini modified for exploit and introduced directly through the developer's server could cause FlashGet to download malware to the computer without alerting the user.

On April 4, 2010, FlashGet 3.4 was released containing adware and other undisclosed and unauthorized Chinese applications. Some of the ads were aggressively popping out of the system tray, causing much inconvenience. The installer was also converted to Chinese making it difficult for many users to install and remove the software.

== See also ==
- Comparison of download managers
