= Tixati =

BitTorrent client

- Tixati v2.53 running on Windows 10
- Developer: Tixati Software Inc.
- Release: June 27, 2009
- Stable release: 3.31 / 11 December 2024; 21 months ago
- Written in: C++
- Operating system: Linux, Windows
- Available in: English
- Type: BitTorrent client
- License: Proprietary
- Website: tixati.com

Tixati is a proprietary BitTorrent client for Linux and Microsoft Windows, written in C++. It has standalone and portable versions with each new client version.

== Features ==
In addition to standard BitTorrent client-sharing functions, Tixati provides integral chatrooms with channel chat as well as encrypted private messaging. Chatrooms can be either public or secret. Users are allowed to optionally share lists of magnet or URL links which are then searchable across all channels a user is joined to. Browsing a specific user's share list is also supported. The channels also allow for streaming audio and video media.

=== Fopnu ===
Since July 20, 2017, the developers of Tixati have released regular updates of a new P2P file sharing system (network and client) called Fopnu. It's visually similar to Tixati but Fopnu is not a torrent client.

== Reception ==
In 2012, TorrentFreak listed Tixati among the top 10 μTorrent alternatives. The same year, it received a positive review from Ghacks. In May 2015, Tixati was the fifth most popular torrent client by the audience of Lifehacker.

On January 6, 2017, the developer announced the release of version 2.52 for user alpha testing, which added an encrypted forum function to the channels. Posts to the forum may be visible to all users in the channel or may be private, between only 2 users. In March 2017, it was listed as a popular BitTorrent client by Tom's Guide. In December 2017, it received a positive review by TechRadar. In January 2018, it was reviewed positively by Lifewire.

== See also ==
- Comparison of BitTorrent clients
- Usage share of BitTorrent clients
- WinMX
