= Veilid =

Network application software

- Developer: Cult of the Dead Cow
- Initial release: August 11, 2023; 2 years ago
- Repository: gitlab.com/veilid/veilid
- Written in: Rust
- License: Mozilla Public License 2.0
- Website: veilid.com

Veilid is a peer-to-peer network and application framework released by the Cult of the Dead Cow on August 11, 2023, at DEF CON 31. Described by its authors as "like Tor, but for apps", it is written in Rust, and runs on Linux, macOS, Windows, Android, iOS, and in-browser WASM. VeilidChat is a secure messaging application built on Veilid.

Veilid borrows from both the Tor anonymising router and the InterPlanetary File System (IPFS), to offer encrypted and anonymous peer-to-peer connection using a 256-bit public key as the only visible ID. Even details such as IP addresses are hidden.

== See also ==
- Anonymous P2P
- Crypto-anarchism
- Darknet
- Deep web
- Freedom of information
