= Darknet =

Private network of connections between trusted peers

Surface web in relation to the deep web and dark web

A darknet or dark net is an overlay network within the Internet that can only be accessed with specific software, configurations, or authorization, and often uses a unique customized communication protocol. Two typical darknet types are social networks (usually used for file hosting with a peer-to-peer connection), and anonymity proxy networks such as Tor via an anonymized series of connections.

The term darknet was popularized by major news outlets and was associated with Tor Onion services when the infamous drug bazaar Silk Road used it, despite the terminology being unofficial. Technology such as Tor, I2P, and Hyphanet are intended to defend digital rights by providing security, anonymity, or censorship resistance and are used for both illegal and legitimate reasons. Anonymous communication between whistle-blowers, activists, journalists and news organisations is also facilitated by darknets through use of applications such as SecureDrop.

== Terminology ==
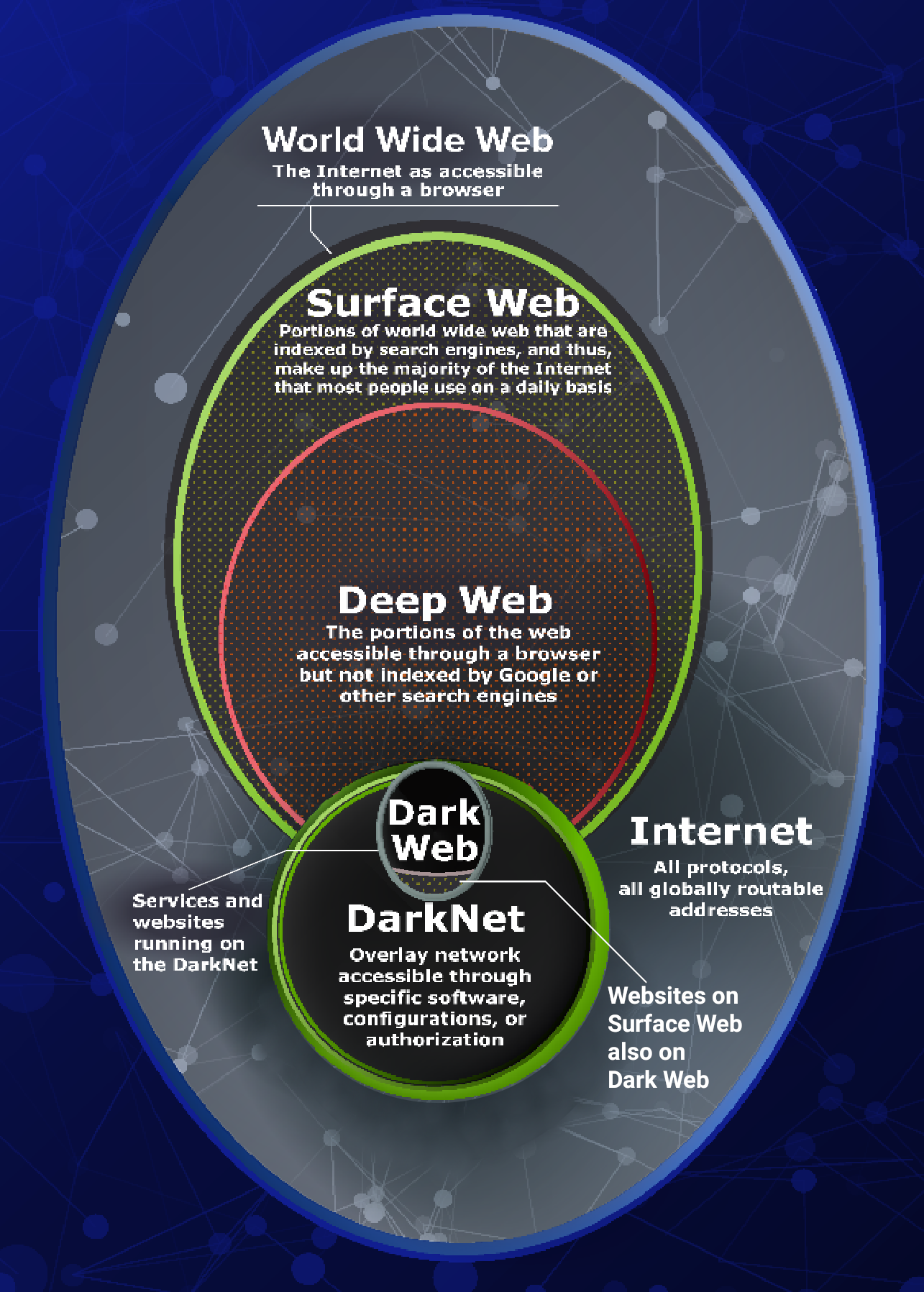
Euler diagram of the deep web, the dark web, and the darknet

The term originally described computers on ARPANET that were hidden, programmed to receive messages but not respond to or acknowledge anything, thus remaining invisible and in the dark.

Since ARPANET, the usage of dark net has expanded to include friend-to-friend networks (usually used for file sharing with a peer-to-peer connection) and privacy networks such as Tor. The reciprocal term for a darknet is a clearnet or the surface web when referring to content indexable by search engines.

The term darknet is often used interchangeably with dark web because of the quantity of hidden services on Tor's darknet. Additionally, the term is often inaccurately used interchangeably with the deep web because of Tor's history as a platform that could not be search-indexed. Mixing uses of both these terms has been described as inaccurate, with some commentators recommending the terms be used in distinct fashions.

== Origins ==
Darknet was coined in the 1970s to designate networks isolated from ARPANET (the government-founded military/academical network which evolved into the Internet), for security purposes. Darknet addresses could receive data from ARPANET but did not appear in the network lists and would not answer pings or other inquiries.

The term gained public acceptance following publication of "The Darknet and the Future of Content Distribution", a 2002 paper by Peter Biddle, Paul England, Marcus Peinado, and Bryan Willman, four employees of Microsoft who argued the presence of the darknet was the primary hindrance to the development of workable digital rights management (DRM) technologies and made copyright infringement inevitable. This paper described darknet more generally as any type of parallel network that is encrypted or requires a specific protocol to allow a user to connect to it.

=== Sub-cultures ===
Journalist J. D. Lasica, in his 2005 book Darknet: Hollywood's War Against the Digital Generation, described the darknet's reach encompassing file sharing networks. Subsequently, in 2014, journalist Jamie Bartlett in his book The Dark Net used the term to describe a range of underground and emergent subcultures, including camgirls, cryptoanarchists, darknet drug markets, self harm communities, social media racists, and transhumanists.

== Uses ==
Darknets in general may be used for various reasons, such as:

- To better protect the privacy rights of citizens from targeted and mass surveillance
- Computer crime (cracking, file corruption, etc.)
- Protecting dissidents from political reprisal
- File sharing (warez, personal files, pornography, confidential files, illegal or counterfeit software, etc.)
- Sale of restricted goods on darknet markets
- Whistleblowing and news leaks
- Purchase or sale of illicit or illegal goods or services
- Circumventing network censorship and content-filtering systems, or bypassing restrictive firewall policies

== Software ==
All darknets require specific software installed or network configurations made to access them, such as Tor, which can be accessed via a customized browser from Vidalia (aka the Tor browser bundle), or alternatively via a proxy configured to perform the same function.

=== Active ===
Tor is the most popular instance of a darknet, and it is often mistakenly thought to be the only online tool that facilitates access to darknets.

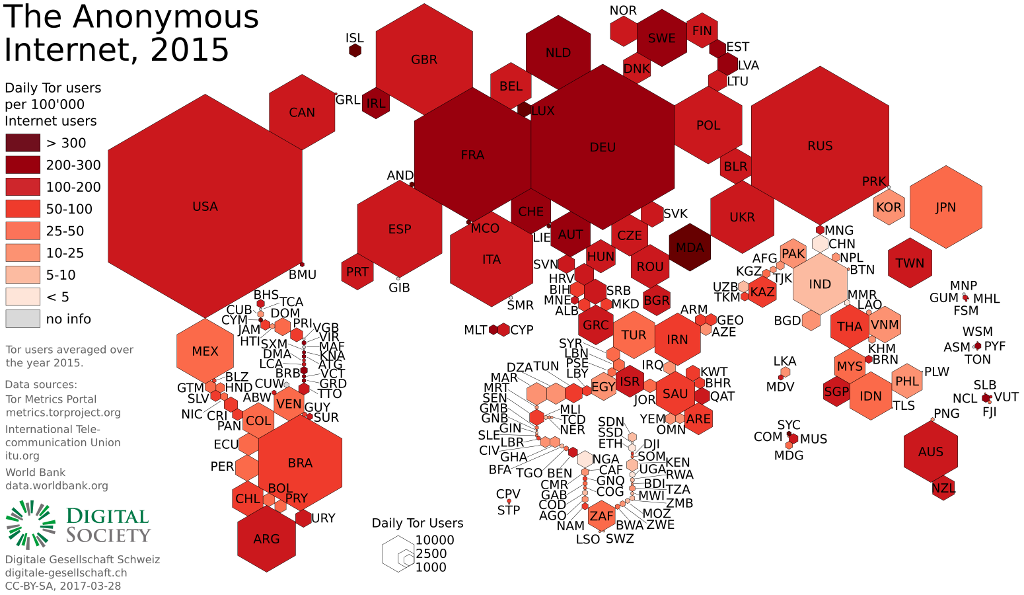
A cartogram illustrating the average number of Tor users per day in 2015

Alphabetical list:

- anoNet is a decentralized friend-to-friend network built using VPN and software BGP routers.
- Decentralized network 42 (not for anonymity but research purposes).
- Freenet is a popular DHT file hosting darknet platform. It supports friend-to-friend and opennet modes.
- GNUnet can be utilized as a darknet if the "F2F (network) topology" option is enabled.
- I2P (Invisible Internet Project) is an overlay proxy network that features hidden services called "Eepsites".
- IPFS has a browser extension that may backup popular webpages.
- RetroShare is a friend-to-friend messenger communication and file transfer platform. It may be used as a darknet if DHT and Discovery features are disabled.
- Riffle is a government, client-server darknet system that simultaneously provides secure anonymity (as long as at least one server remains uncompromised), efficient computation, and minimal bandwidth burden.
- Secure Scuttlebutt is a peer-to peer communication protocol, mesh network, and self-hosted social media ecosystem.
- Syndie is software used to publish distributed forums over the anonymous networks of I2P, Tor and Freenet.
- Tor (The onion router) is an anonymity network that also features a darknet – via its onion services.
- Tribler is an anonymous BitTorrent client with built in search engine, and non-web, worldwide publishing through channels.
- Urbit is a federated system of personal servers in a peer-to-peer overlay network.

=== No longer supported ===
- StealthNet (discontinued)
- WASTE
- Zeronet is a DHT Web 2.0 hosting with Tor users.

=== Defunct ===
- AllPeers
- Turtle F2F

== See also ==
- Crypto-anarchism
- Cryptocurrency
- Darknet market
- Dark web
- Deep web
- Online illicit drug vendor
- Private peer-to-peer (P2P)
- Sneakernet
- Virtual private network (VPN)
