= Private peer-to-peer =

Computer network that restrics participation to trusted peers

Private peer-to-peer systems are peer-to-peer (P2P) systems that allow only mutually trusted peers to participate. This can be achieved by using a central server such as a Direct Connect hub to authenticate clients. Alternatively, users can exchange passwords or cryptographic keys with friends to form a decentralized network. Private peer-to-peer systems can be divided into friend-to-friend (F2F) and group-based systems. Friend-to-friend systems only allow connections between users who know one another, but may also provide automatic anonymous forwarding. Group-based systems allow any user to connect to any other, and thus they cannot grow in size without compromising their users' privacy. Some software, such as WASTE, can be configured to create either group-based or F2F networks.

== Software list ==
- Direct Connect - file sharing and chat using private hubs
- GigaTribe - a private community-oriented file-sharing program
- Retroshare - a private F2F system based on PGP, implementing Turtle F2F file sharing.
- n2n - a peer-to-peer VPN software

The following software titles have been discontinued.

- Infinit - file sharing app with local encryption based on research made at the University of Cambridge.
- Madster (formerly Aimster) - early P2P software that used a buddy list to restrict sharing
- Groove - a corporate groupware software based on P2P technology
- Turtle F2F - instant messaging and file sharing with private connections only
- WASTE - private P2P software suitable for groups of 10 to 50 users

== See also ==
- Friend-to-friend
- Darknet
- LAN messenger
- Social VPN
