= Freedom of information =

Freedom of a person or people to publish and consume information

Free Speech Flag, from the HD DVD AACS case

Freedom of information is the freedom of a person or people to publish and have access to information. Article 19 of the Universal Declaration of Human Rights provides for the right to "receive and impart information and ideas through any media and regardless of frontiers", while access to information encompasses the ability of an individual to seek, receive and impart information effectively. As articulated by UNESCO, it encompasses

"scientific, indigenous, and traditional knowledge; freedom of information, building of open knowledge resources, including open Internet and open standards, and open access and availability of data; preservation of digital heritage; respect for cultural and linguistic diversity, such as fostering access to local content in accessible languages; quality education for all, including lifelong and e-learning; diffusion of new media and information literacy and skills, and social inclusion online, including addressing inequalities based on skills, education, gender, age, race, ethnicity, and accessibility by those with disabilities; and the development of connectivity and affordable ICTs, including mobile, the Internet, and broadband infrastructures".

Public access to government information, including through the open publication of information, and formal freedom of information laws, is widely considered to be an important basic component of democracy and integrity in government.

Michael Buckland defines six types of barriers that have to be overcome in order for access to information to be achieved: identification of the source, availability of the source, price of the user, cost to the provider, cognitive access, and acceptability. While "access to information", "right to information", "right to know" and "freedom of information" are sometimes used as synonyms, the diverse terminology does highlight particular (albeit related) dimensions of the issue.

Freedom of information is related to freedom of expression, which can apply to any medium, be it oral, writing, print, electronic, or through art forms. This means that the protection of freedom of speech as a right includes not only the content, but also the means of expression. Freedom of information is a separate concept which sometimes comes into conflict with the right to privacy in the context of the Internet and information technology. As with the right to freedom of expression, the right to privacy is a recognized human right and freedom of information acts as an extension to this right. The government of the United Kingdom has theorised it as being an extension of freedom of speech, and a fundamental human right. It is recognized in international law. The international and United States Pirate Party have established political platforms based largely on freedom of information issues.

== Overview ==
There has been a significant increase in global access to the Internet, which reached just over 5.35 billion users in 2024, amounting to about 66 per cent of the world's population. But the digital divide continues to exclude over half of the world's population, particularly women and girls, and especially in Africa and the least developed countries as well as several Small Island Developing States. Further, individuals with disabilities can either be advantaged or further disadvantaged by the design of technologies or through the presence or absence of training and education.

== Context ==
=== The Digital Divide ===
Access to information faces great difficulties because of the global digital divide, which is an economic and social inequality concerning access to, use of, or impact of information and communication technologies (ICT). The divide within countries (such as the digital divide in the United States) may refer to inequalities between individuals, households, businesses, or geographic areas, usually at different socioeconomic levels or other demographic categories. The divide between differing countries or regions of the world is referred to as the global digital divide, examining this technological gap between developing and developed countries on an international scale.

==== Racial divide ====
Although many groups in society are affected by a lack of access to computers or the internet, communities of color are specifically observed to be negatively affected by the digital divide. This is evident when it comes to observing home-internet access among different races and ethnicities. 81% of Whites and 83% of Asians have home internet access, compared to 70% of Hispanics, 68% of Blacks, 72% of American Indian/Alaska Natives, and 68% of Native Hawaiian/Pacific Islanders. Although income is a factor in home-internet access disparities, there are still racial and ethnic inequalities that are present among those within lower-income groups. 58% of low-income Whites are reported to have home-internet access in comparison to 51% of Hispanics and 50% of Blacks. This information is reported in a report titled Digital Denied: The Impact of Systemic Racial Discrimination on Home-Internet Adoption which was published by the DC-based public interest group Fress Press. The report concludes that structural barriers and discrimination that perpetuates bias against people of different races and ethnicities contribute to having an impact on the digital divide. The report also concludes that those who do not have internet access still have a high demand for it, and reduction in the price of home-internet access would allow for an increase in equitable participation and improve internet adoption by marginalized groups.

Digital censorship and algorithmic bias are observed to be present in the racial divide. Hate-speech rules as well as hate-speech algorithms on online platforms such as Facebook have favored white males and those belonging to elite groups in society over marginalized groups in society, such as women and people of color. In a collection of internal documents that were collected in a project conducted by ProPublica, Facebook's guidelines regarding distinguishing hate speech and recognizing protected groups revealed slides that identified three groups, each one containing either female drivers, black children, or white men. When the question of which subset group is protected is presented, the correct answer was white men. Minority group language is negatively impacted by automated tools of hate detection due to human bias that ultimately decides what is considered hate speech and what is not.

Online platforms have also been observed to tolerate hateful content towards people of color but restrict content from people of color. Aboriginal memes on a Facebook page were posted with racially abusive content and comments depicting Aboriginal people as inferior. While the contents on the page were removed by the originators after an investigation conducted by the Australian Communications and Media Authority, Facebook did not delete the page and has allowed it to remain under the classification of controversial humor. However, a post by an African American woman addressing her discomfort with being the only person of color in a small-town restaurant was met with racist and hateful messages. When reporting the online abuse to Facebook, her account was suspended for three days for posting the screenshots while those responsible for the racist comments she received were not suspended. Shared experiences between people of color can be at risk of being silenced under removal policies for online platforms.

==== Disability divide ====
Inequities in access to information technologies are present among individuals living with a disability in comparison to those who are not living with a disability. According to The Pew Internet 54% of households with a person who has a disability have home internet access compared to 81% of households that have home internet access and do not have a person who has a disability. The type of disability an individual has can prevent one from interacting with computer screens and smartphone screens, such as having a quadriplegia disability or having a disability in the hands. However, there is still a lack of access to technology and home internet access among those who have a cognitive and auditory disability as well. There is a concern about whether or not the increase in the use of information technologies will increase equality through offering opportunities for individuals living with disabilities or whether it will only add to the present inequalities and lead to individuals living with disabilities being left behind in society. Issues such as the perception of disabilities in society, federal and state government policy, corporate policy, mainstream computing technologies, and real-time online communication have been found to contribute to the impact of the digital divide on individuals with disabilities.

People with disabilities are also the target of online abuse. Online disability hate crimes increased by 33% from 2018—19 across England and Wales according to a report published by Leonard Cheshire.org. Accounts of online hate abuse towards people with disabilities were shared during an incident in 2019 when model Katie Price's son was the target of online abuse that was attributed to him having a disability. In response to the abuse, a campaign was launched by Katie Price to ensure that Britain's MP's held those who are guilty of perpetuating online abuse towards those with disabilities accountable. Online abuse towards individuals with disabilities is a factor that can discourage people from engaging online which could prevent people from learning information that could improve their lives. Many individuals living with disabilities face online abuse in the form of accusations of benefit fraud and "faking" their disability for financial gain, which in some cases leads to unnecessary investigations.

=== Gender divide ===
Women's freedom of information and access to information globally is less than men's. Social barriers such as illiteracy and lack of digital empowerment have created stark inequalities in navigating the tools used for access to information, often exacerbating lack of awareness of issues that directly relate to women and gender, such as sexual health. There have also been examples of more extreme measures, such as local community authorities banning or restricting mobile phone use for girls and unmarried women in their communities. According to the Wharton School of Public Policy, the expansion of Information and Communication Technology (ICT) has resulted in multiple disparities that have had an impact on women's access to ICT with the gender gap being as high as 31% in some developing countries and 12% globally in 2016. Socioeconomic barriers that result from these disparities are known as the digital divide. Among low-income countries and low-income regions alike, the high price of internet access presents a barrier to women since women are generally paid less and face an unequal burden between paid and unpaid work. Cultural norms in certain countries may prohibit women from accessing the internet and technology as well by preventing them from attaining a certain level of education or from being the breadwinners in their households, thus resulting in a lack of control in the household finances. However, even when women have access to ICT, the digital divide is still prevalent.

=== Queer divide, and repression by states and tech companies ===
A number of states, including some that have introduced new laws since 2010, notably censor voices from and content related to the Queer community, posing serious consequences to access to information about sexual orientation and gender identity. Digital platforms play a powerful role in limiting access to certain content, such as YouTube's 2017 decision to classify non-explicit videos with queer themes as 'restricted', a classification designed to filter out "potentially inappropriate content". The internet provides information that can create a safe space for marginalized groups such as the queer community to connect with others and engage in honest dialogue and conversations that are affecting their communities. It can be viewed as an agent of change for the queer community and provide a means of engaging in social justice. It can allow queer individuals who may be living in rural or isolated areas, to gain access to information that is not within their environment. This includes information such as healthcare, partners, and news. Gay Health provides online medical and health information and Gay and Lesbian Alliance Against Defamation (GLAAD) provides online publications that focus on human rights campaigns and queer issues. The Internet also allows queer individuals to maintain anonymity. The lack of broadband access in remote rural areas is a problem that cuts people of from these resources. LGBT Tech has emphasized launching newer technologies with 5G technology to help close the digital divide that can cause members of the queer community to lose access to reliable and fast technology that can provide information on healthcare, economic opportunities, and safe communities.

Other factors can prevent queer people from accessing information online or subject them to having their information abused. Internet filters are used to censor and restrict queer related content in public schools and libraries. There is also the presence of online abuse that targets queer people by seeking out their personal information or misleading them with inaccurate information. The use of the internet can provide a way for queer individuals to access information to cope with societal setbacks through therapeutic advice, social support systems, and an online environment that fosters a collaboration of ideas, concerns, that helps them move forward. This can be fostered through human service professionals who can utilize the internet with evidence and evaluation to provide information to individuals who are dealing with the circumstance of coming out and the possible repercussions that could follow as a result.

=== The security argument ===
With the evolution of the digital age, the application of freedom of speech and its corollaries (freedom of information, access to information) becomes more controversial as new means of communication and restrictions arise including government control or commercial methods putting personal information in danger.

== Digital access ==
Freedom of information (or information freedom) also refers to the protection of the right to freedom of expression with regard to the Internet and information technology. Freedom of information may also concern censorship in an information technology context, i.e. the ability to access Web content, without censorship or restrictions.

=== Information and media literacy ===
According to Kuzmin and Parshakova, access to information entails learning in formal and informal education settings. It also entails fostering the competencies of information and media literacy that enable users to be empowered and make full use of access to the Internet.

UNESCO's support for journalism education is an example of how UNESCO seeks to contribute to the provision of independent and verifiable information accessible in cyberspace. Promoting access for disabled persons has been strengthened by the UNESCO-convened conference in 2014, which adopted the "New Delhi Declaration on Inclusive ICTs for Persons with Disabilities: Making Empowerment a Reality".

=== Open standards ===
According to the International Telecommunication Union (ITU), "Open Standards" are standards made available to the general public and developed (or approved) and maintained via a collaborative and consensus-driven process. "Open Standards" facilitate interoperability and data exchange among different products or services and are intended for widespread adoption." A UNESCO study considers that adopting open standards has the potential to contribute to the vision of a ‘digital commons’ in which citizens can freely find, share, and re-use information. Promoting Free and open-source software, which is both free of cost and freely modifiable could help meet the particular needs of marginalized users advocacy on behalf of minority groups, such as targeted outreach, better provision of Internet access, tax incentives for private companies and organizations working to enhance access, and solving underlying issues of social and economic inequalities

=== The Information Society and freedom of expression ===
The World Summit on the Information Society (WSIS) Declaration of Principles adopted in 2003 reaffirms democracy and the universality, indivisibility and interdependence of all human rights and fundamental freedoms. The Declaration also makes specific reference to the importance of the right to freedom of expression for the "Information Society" in stating:

We reaffirm, as an essential foundation of the Information Society, and as outlined in Article 19 of the Universal Declaration of Human Rights, that everyone has the right to freedom of opinion and expression; that this right includes freedom to hold opinions without interference and to seek, receive and impart information and ideas through any media and regardless of frontiers. Communication is a fundamental social process, a basic human need and the foundation of all social organisation. It is central to the Information Society. Everyone, everywhere should have the opportunity to participate and no one should be excluded from the benefits the Information Society offers.

The 2004 WSIS Declaration of Principles also acknowledged that "it is necessary to prevent the use of information resources and technologies for criminal and terrorist purposes, while respecting human rights". Wolfgang Benedek comments that the WSIS Declaration only contains a number of references to human rights and does not spell out any procedures or mechanism to assure that human rights are considered in practice.

=== Hacktivismo ===
The digital rights group Hacktivismo, founded in 1999, argues that access to information is a basic human right. The group's beliefs are described fully in the "Hacktivismo Declaration" which calls for the Universal Declaration of Human Rights and the International Covenant on Civil and Political Rights (ICCPR) to be applied to the Internet. The Declaration recalls the duty of member states to the ICCPR to protect the right to freedom of expression with regard to the internet and in this context freedom of information. The Hacktivismo Declaration recognizes "the importance to fight against human rights abuses with respect to reasonable access to information on the Internet" and calls upon the hacker community to "study ways and means of circumventing state sponsored censorship of the internet" and "implement technologies to challenge information rights violations". The Hacktivismo Declaration does, however, recognise that the right to freedom of expression is subject to limitations, stating "we recognized the right of governments to forbid the publication of properly categorized state secrets, child pornography, and matters related to personal privacy and privilege, among other accepted restrictions." However, the Hacktivist Declaration states "but we oppose the use of state power to control access to the works of critics, intellectuals, artists, or religious figures."

=== Global Network Initiative ===
On October 29, 2008, the Global Network Initiative (GNI) was founded upon its "Principles on Freedom of Expression and Privacy". The Initiative was launched in the 60th Anniversary year of the Universal Declaration of Human Rights (UDHR) and is based on internationally recognized laws and standards for human rights on freedom of expression and privacy set out in the UDHR, the International Covenant on Civil and Political Rights (ICCPR) and the International Covenant on Economic, Social and Cultural Rights (ICESCR). Participants in the Initiative include the Electronic Frontier Foundation, Human Rights Watch, Google, Microsoft, Yahoo, other major companies, human rights NGOs, investors, and academics.

According to reports, Cisco Systems was invited to the initial discussions but did not take part in the initiative. Harrington Investments, which proposed that Cisco establish a human rights board, has dismissed the GNI as a voluntary code of conduct not having any impact. Chief executive John Harrington called the GNI "meaningless noise" and instead calls for bylaws to be introduced that force boards of directors to accept human rights responsibilities.

=== Internet censorship ===
Jo Glanville, editor of the Index on Censorship, states that "the internet has been a revolution for censorship as much as for free speech". The concept of freedom of information has emerged in response to state-sponsored censorship, monitoring and surveillance of the internet. Internet censorship includes the control or suppression of the publishing or accessing of information on the Internet.

According to the Reporters without Borders (RSF) "internet enemy list" the following states engage in pervasive internet censorship: Cuba, Iran, Maldives, Myanmar/Burma, North Korea, Syria, Tunisia, Uzbekistan and Vietnam. A widely publicised example is the so-called "Great Firewall of China" (in reference both to its role as a network firewall and to the ancient Great Wall of China). The system blocks content by preventing IP addresses from being routed through and consists of standard firewalls and proxy servers at the Internet gateways. The system also selectively engages in DNS poisoning when particular sites are requested. The government does not appear to be systematically examining Internet content, as this appears to be technically impractical. Internet censorship in the People's Republic of China is conducted under a wide variety of laws and administrative regulations. In accordance with these laws, more than sixty Internet regulations have been made by the government, and censorship systems are vigorously implemented by provincial branches of state-owned ISPs, business companies, and organizations.

In 2010, U.S. Secretary of State Hillary Clinton, speaking on behalf of the United States, declared 'we stand for a single internet where all of humanity has equal access to knowledge and ideas'. In her 'Remarks on Internet Freedom' she also draws attention to how 'even in authoritarian countries, information networks are helping people discover new facts and making governments more accountable', while reporting President Barack Obama's pronouncement 'the more freely information flows, the stronger societies become'.

== Privacy protections ==
=== Privacy, surveillance and encryption ===
The increasing access to and reliance on digital media to receive and produce information have increased the possibilities for States and private sector companies to track individuals’ behaviors, opinions and networks. States have increasingly adopted laws and policies to legalize monitoring of communication, justifying these practices with the need to defend their own citizens and national interests. New anti-terrorism laws have enabled a greater degree of government surveillance and an increase in the ability of intelligence authorities to access citizens’ data. While legality is a precondition for legitimate limitations of human rights, the issue is also whether a given law is aligned to other criteria for justification such as necessity, proportionality and legitimate purpose.

==== International framework ====
The United Nations Human Rights Council has taken a number of steps to highlight the importance of the universal right to privacy online. In 2015, in a resolution on the right to privacy in the digital age, it established a United Nations Special Rapporteur on the Right to Privacy. In 2017, the Human Rights Council emphasized that the ‘unlawful or arbitrary surveillance and/ or interception of communications, as well as the unlawful or arbitrary collection of personal data, as highly intrusive acts, violate the right to privacy, can interfere with other human rights, including the right to freedom of expression and to hold opinions without interference’.

==== Regional framework ====
The Council of Europe’s Convention 108, the Convention for the protection of individuals with regard to automatic processing of personal data, has undergone a modernization process to address new challenges to privacy. Since 2012, four new countries belonging to the Council of Europe have signed or ratified the Convention, as well as three countries that do not belong to the Council, from Africa and Latin America.

Regional courts are also playing a noteworthy role in the development of online privacy regulations. In 2015 the European Court of Justice found that the Safe Harbor Privacy Principles which allowed private companies to legally transmit personal data from their European subscribers to the US was not valid under European law in that it did not offer sufficient protections for the data of European citizens or protect them from arbitrary surveillance. In 2016, the European Commission and United States Government reached an agreement to replace Safe Harbour, the EU-U.S. Privacy Shield, which includes data protection obligations on companies receiving personal data from the European Union, safeguards on United States government access to data, protection and redress for individuals, and an annual joint review to monitor implementation.

The European Court of Justice's 2014 decision in the Google Spain case allowed people to claim a "right to be forgotten" or "right to be de-listed" in a much-debated approach to the balance between privacy, free expression and transparency. Following the Google Spain decision the "right to be forgotten" or "right to be de-listed" has been recognized in a number of countries across the world, particularly in Latin America and the Caribbean.

Recital 153 of the European Union General Data Protection Regulation states "Member States law should reconcile the rules governing freedom of expression and information, including journalistic...with the right to the protection of personal data pursuant to this Regulation. The processing of personal data solely for journalistic purposes...should be subject to derogations or exemptions from certain provisions of this Regulation if necessary to reconcile the right to the protection of personal data with the right to freedom of expression and information, as enshrined in Article 11 of the Charter."

==== National framework ====
The number of countries around the world with data protection laws has also continued to grow. According to the World Trends Report 2017/2018, between 2012 and 2016, 20 UNESCO Member States adopted data protection laws for the first time, bringing the global total to 101. Of these new adoptions, nine were in Africa, four in Asia and the Pacific, three in Latin America and the Caribbean, two in the Arab region and one in Western Europe and North America. During the same period, 23 countries revised their data protection laws, reflecting the new challenges to data protection in the digital era.

According to Global Partners Digital, only four States have secured in national legislation a general right to encryption, and 31 have enacted national legislation that grants law enforcement agencies the power to intercept or decrypt encrypted communications.

==== Private sector ====
Examples of this have been WhatsApp's implementation of full end-to-end encryption in its messenger service, and Apple's contestation of a law enforcement warrant to unlock an iPhone used by the perpetrators of a terror attack. Apple has complied with the U.S government's request to remove apps that warn people hunted by the U.S government of imminent risk of encountering ICE officers, and removed VPN protections in China

=== Protection of confidential sources and whistle-blowing ===
Rapid changes in the digital environment, coupled with contemporary journalist practice that increasingly rely on digital communication technologies, pose new risks for the protection of journalism sources. Leading contemporary threats include mass surveillance technologies, mandatory data retention policies, and disclosure of personal digital activities by third-party intermediaries. Without a thorough understanding of how to shield their digital communication and traces, journalists and sources can unwittingly reveal identifying information. Employment of national security legislation, such as counter-terrorism laws, to override existing legal protections for source protection is also becoming a common practice. In many regions, persistent secrecy laws or new cybersecurity laws threaten the protection of sources, such as when they give governments the right to intercept online communications in the interest of overly broad definitions of national security.

Developments regarding source protection laws have occurred between 2007 and mid-2015 in 84 (69 per cent) of the 121 countries surveyed. The Arab region had the most notable developments, where 86 per cent of States had demonstrated shifts, followed by Latin America and the Caribbean (85 per cent), Asia and the Pacific (75 per cent), Western Europe and North America (66 per cent) and finally Africa, where 56 per cent of States examined had revised their source protection laws.

As of 2015, at least 60 nations had adopted some form of whistle-blower protection. At the international level, the United Nations Convention against Corruption entered into force in 2005. By July 2017, the majority of countries around the globe, 179 in total, had ratified the convention, which includes provisions for the protection of whistleblowers.

Since 2012, the addition of 23 UNESCO Member States that have ratified, accepted or acceded to the convention

Regional conventions against corruption that contain protection for whistle-blowers have also been widely ratified. These include the Inter-American Convention Against Corruption, which has been ratified by 33 Member States, and the African Union Convention on Preventing and Combating Corruption, which was ratified by 36 UNESCO Member States.

In 2009, the Organisation for Economic Co-operation and Development (OECD) Council adopted the Recommendation for Further Combating Bribery of Foreign Public Officials in International Business Transactions.

== Media pluralism ==
According to the World Trends Report, access to a variety of media increased between 2012 and 2016. The internet has registered the highest growth in users supported by massive investments in infrastructure and significant uptake in mobile usage.

=== Internet mobile ===
The United Nations 2030 Agenda for Sustainable Development, the work of the Broadband Commission for Sustainable Development, co-chaired by UNESCO, and the Internet Governance Forum's intersessional work on 'Connecting the Next Billion' are proof of the international commitments towards providing Internet access for all. According to the International Telecommunication Union (ITU), by the end of 2017, an estimated 48 per cent of individuals regularly connect to the internet, up from 34 per cent in 2012. Despite the significant increase in absolute numbers, however, in the same period the annual growth rate of internet users has slowed down, with five per cent annual growth in 2017, dropping from a 10 per cent growth rate in 2012.

The number of unique mobile cellular subscriptions increased from 3.89 billion in 2012 to 4.83 billion in 2016, two-thirds of the world’s population, with more than half of subscriptions located in Asia and the Pacific. The number of subscriptions is predicted to rise to 5.69 billion users in 2020. As of 2016, almost 60 per cent of the world’s population had access to a 4G broadband cellular network, up from almost 50 per cent in 2015 and 11 per cent in 2012.

The limits that users face on accessing information via mobile applications coincide with a broader process of fragmentation of the internet. Zero-rating, the practice of internet providers allowing users free connectivity to access specific content or applications , has offered some opportunities for individuals to surmount economic hurdles, but has also been accused by its critics of creating a 'two-tiered' internet. To address the issues with zero-rating, an alternative model has emerged in the concept of ‘equal rating’ and is being tested in experiments by Mozilla and Orange in Africa. Equal rating prevents prioritization of one type of content and zero-rates all content up to a specified data cap. Some countries in the region had a handful of plans to choose from (across all mobile network operators) while others, such as Colombia, offered as many as 30 pre-paid and 34 post-paid plans.

Percentage of individuals using the internet (2012–2017)

=== Broadcast media ===
In Western Europe and North America, the primacy of television as a main source of information is being challenged by the internet, while in other regions, such as Africa, television is gaining greater audience share than radio, which has historically been the most widely accessed media platform. Age plays a profound role in determining the balance between radio, television and the internet as the leading source of news. According to the 2017 Reuters Institute Digital News Report, in 36 countries and territories surveyed, 51 per cent of adults 55 years and older consider television as their main news source, compared to only 24 per cent of respondents between 18 and 24. The pattern is reversed when it comes to online media, chosen by 64 per cent of users between 18 and 24 as their primary source, but only by 28 per cent of users 55 and older. According to the Arab Youth Survey, in 2016, 45 percent of the young people interviewed considered social media as a major source of news.

Satellite television has continued to add global or transnational alternatives to national viewing options for many audiences. Global news providers such as the BBC, Al Jazeera, Agence France-Presse, RT (formerly Russia Today) and the Spanish-language Agencia EFE, have used the internet and satellite television to better reach audiences across borders and have added specialist broadcasts to target specific foreign audiences. Reflecting a more outward-looking orientation, China Global Television Network (CGTN), the multi-language and multi-channel grouping owned and operated by China Central Television, changed its name from CCTV-NEWS in January 2017. After years of budget cuts and shrinking global operations, in 2016 BBC announced the launch of 12 new language services (in Afaan Oromo, Amharic, Gujarati, Igbo, Korean, Marathi, Pidgin, Punjabi, Telugu, Tigrinya, and Yoruba), branded as a component of its biggest expansion ‘since the 1940s’.

Also expanding access to content are changes in usage patterns with non-linear viewing, as online streaming is becoming an important component of users’ experience. Since expanding its global service to 130 new countries in January 2016, Netflix experienced a surge in subscribers, surpassing 100 million subscribers in the second quarter of 2017, up from 40 million in 2012. The audience has also become more diverse with 47 per cent of users based outside of the United States, where the company began in 1997.

=== Newspaper industry ===
The Internet has challenged the press as an alternative source of information and opinion but has also provided a new platform for newspaper organizations to reach new audiences. Between 2012 and 2016, print newspaper circulation continued to fall in almost all regions, except Asia and the Pacific, where the dramatic increase in sales in a few select countries has offset falls in historically strong Asian markets such as Japan and the Republic of Korea. Between 2012 and 2016, India’s print circulation grew by 89 per cent. As many newspapers make the transition to online platforms, revenues from digital subscriptions and digital advertising have been growing significantly. How to capture more of this growth remains a pressing challenge for newspapers.

== International framework ==
=== UNESCO's work ===
==== Mandate ====
The 2030 Agenda for Sustainable Development, adopted by the United Nations General Assembly in September 2015, includes Goal 16.10 to "ensure public access to information and protect fundamental freedoms, in accordance with national legislation and international agreements" UNESCO has been assigned as the custodian agency responsible for global reporting on indicator 16.10.2 regarding the "number of countries that adopt and implement constitutional, statutory and/or policy guarantees for public access to information." This responsibility aligns with UNESCO's commitment to promote universal access to information, grounded in its constitutional mandate to "promote the free flow of ideas by word and image". In 2015, UNESCO's General Conference proclaimed 28 September as the International Day for Universal Access to Information. The following year, participants of UNESCO's annual celebration of World Press Freedom Day adopted the Finlandia Declaration on access to information and fundamental freedoms, 250 years after the first freedom of information law was adopted in what is modern day Finland and Sweden.

==== History ====
- 38th Session of the General Conference in 2015, Resolution 38 C/70 proclaiming 28 September as the "International Day for the Universal Access to Information"
- Article 19 of the Universal Declaration of Human Rights, adopted in 1948, sets out the right to receive and impart information and ideas.
- Article 19 of the International Covenant on Civil and Political Rights, adopted in 1966, referred first to "the right to hold opinions without interference", and then to "freedom to seek, receive and impart information and ideas of all kinds".
- The Brisbane Declaration, adopted at the UNESCO World Press Freedom Day conference held in Brisbane, Australia, on 3 May 2010.
- Dakar Declaration
- Finlandia Declaration
- Maputo Declaration
- New Delhi Declaration
- Recommendation concerning the Promotion and Use of Multilingualism and Universal Access to Cyberspace 2003
- United Nations Convention on the Rights of Persons with Disabilities

==== The International Programme for Development of Communication ====
The International Programme for the Development of Communication (IPDC) is a United Nations Educational, Scientific and Cultural Organization (UNESCO) programme aimed at strengthening the development of mass media in developing countries. Its mandate since 2003 is "... to contribute to sustainable development, democracy and good governance by fostering universal access to and distribution of information and knowledge by strengthening the capacities of the developing countries and countries in transition in the field of electronic media and the printed press."

The International Programme for the Development of Communication is responsible for the follow-up of the Sustainable Development Goal (SDG) through indicators 16.10.1 and 16.10.2. Every two years, a report containing information from the Member States on the status of judicial inquiries on each of the killings condemned by UNESCO is submitted to the IPDC Council by UNESCO's Director-General. The journalists safety indicators are a tool developed by UNESCO which, according to UNESCO's website, aims on mapping the key features that can help assess safety of journalists, and help determine whether adequate follow-up is given to crimes committed against them. The IPDC Talks also allow the Programme to raise awareness of the importance of access to information. The IPDC is also the programme that monitors and reports on access to information laws around the world through the United Nations Secretary-General global report on follow-up to SDGs.

On 28 September 2015, UNESCO adopted the International Day for the Universal Access to Information during its 38th session. During the International Day, the IPDC organized the "IPDC Talks: Powering Sustainable Development with Access to Information" event, which gathered high-level participants. The annual event aims on highlighting the "importance of access to information" for sustainable development.

==== The Internet Universality framework ====
Internet Universality is the concept that "the Internet is much more than infrastructure and applications; it is a network of economic and social interactions and relationships, which has the potential to enable human rights, empower individuals and communities, and facilitate sustainable development. The concept is based on four principles stressing that the Internet should be Human rights-based, Open, Accessible, and based on Multistakeholder participation. These have been abbreviated as the R-O-A-M principles. Understanding the Internet in this way helps to draw together different facets of Internet development, concerned with technology and public policy, rights and development."

Through the concept of internet universality UNESCO highlights access to information as a key to assess a better Internet environment. There is special relevance to the Internet of the broader principle of social inclusion. This puts forward the role of accessibility in overcoming digital divides, digital inequalities, and exclusions based on skills, literacy, language, gender or disability. It also points to the need for sustainable business models for Internet activity, and to trust in the preservation, quality, integrity, security, and authenticity of information and knowledge. Accessibility is interlinked to rights and openness. Based on the ROAM principles, UNESCO is now developing Internet Universality indicators to help governments and other stakeholders assess their own national Internet environments and to promote the values associated with Internet Universality, such as access to information.

=== The World Bank initiatives ===
In 2010, the World Bank launched the World Bank policy on access to information, which constitutes a major shift in the World Bank's strategy. The principle binds the World Bank to disclose any requested information, unless it is on a "list of exception":

1. "Personal information
2. Communications of Governors and/or Executive Directors’ Offices
3. Ethics Committee
4. Attorney-Client Privilege
5. Security and Safety Information
6. Separate Disclosure Regimes
7. Confidential Client/Third Party Information
8. Corporate Administrative
9. Deliberative Information*
10. Financial Information"

The World Bank is prone to Open Developments with its Open data, Open Finance and Open knowledge repository.

=== The World Summit on the Information Societies ===
The World Summit on the Information Society (WSIS) was a two-phase United Nations-sponsored summit on information, communication and, in broad terms, the information society that took place in 2003 in Geneva and in 2005 in Tunis. One of its chief aims was to bridge the global digital divide separating rich countries from poor countries by spreading access to the Internet in the developing world. The conferences established 17 May as World Information Society Day.

== Regional framework ==
The results from UNESCO monitoring of SDG 16.10.2 show that 112 countries have now adopted freedom of information legislation or similar administrative regulations. Of these, 22 adopted new legislation since 2012. At the regional level, Africa has seen the highest growth, with 10 countries adopting freedom of information legislation in the last five years, more than doubling the number of countries in the region to have such legislation from nine to 19. A similarly high growth rate has occurred in the Asia-Pacific region, where seven countries adopted freedom of information laws in the last five years, bringing the total to 22. In addition, during the reporting period, two countries in the Arab region, two countries in Latin America and the Caribbean, and one country in Western Europe and North America adopted freedom of information legislation. The vast majority of the world's population now lives in a country with a freedom of information law, and several countries currently have freedom of information bills under consideration.

== National framework ==
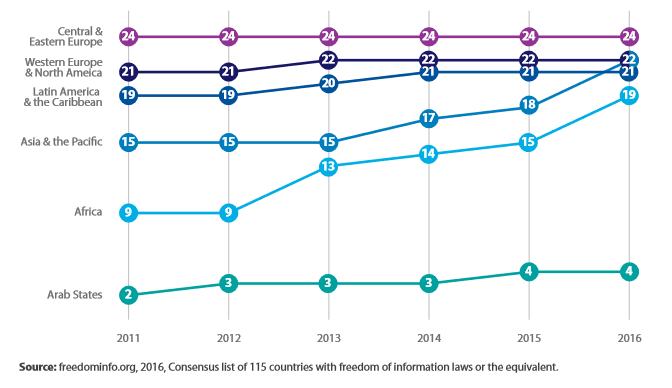
UNESCO Member States by region with a freedom of information law or policy

=== Freedom of information laws ===
In June 2006, nearly 70 countries had freedom of information legislation applying to information held by government bodies and in certain circumstances to private bodies. In 19 of these countries, the freedom of information legislation also applied to private bodies. Access to information was increasingly recognised as a prerequisite for transparency and accountability of governments, as facilitating consumers' ability to make informed choices, and as safeguarding citizens against mismanagement and corruption. This has led an increasing number of countries to enact freedom of information legislation in the past 10 years. In recent years, private bodies have started to perform functions which were previously carried out by public bodies. Privatisation and deregulation saw banks, telecommunications companies, hospitals and universities being run by private entities, leading to demands for the extension of freedom of information legislation to cover private bodies.

While there has been an increase in countries with freedom of information laws, their implementation and effectiveness vary considerably across the world. The Global Right to Information Rating is a programme providing advocates, legislators, and reformers with tools to assess the strength of a legal framework. In measuring the strength and legal framework of each country's freedom of information law using the Right to Information Rating, one notable trend appears. Largely regardless of geographic location, top-scoring countries tend to have younger laws. According to the United Nations Secretary General’s 2017 report on the Sustainable Development Goals, to which UNESCO contributed freedom of information-related information, of the 109 countries with available data on implementation of freedom of information laws, 43 per cent do not sufficiently provide for public outreach and 43 per cent have overly-wide definitions of exceptions to disclosure, which run counter to the aim of increased transparency and accountability.

Despite the adoption of freedom of information laws, officials are often unfamiliar with the norms of transparency at the core of freedom of information or are unwilling to recognize them in practice. Journalists often do not make effective use of freedom of information laws for a multitude of reasons: official failure to respond to information requests, extensive delays, receipt of heavily redacted documents, arbitrarily steep fees for certain types of requests, and a lack of professional training.

Debates around public access to information have also focused on further developments in encouraging open data approaches to government transparency. In 2009, the data.gov portal was launched in the United States, collecting in one place most of the government open data; in the years following, there was a wave of government data opening around the world. As part of the Open Government Partnership, a multilateral network established in 2011, some 70 countries have now issued National Action Plans, the majority of which contain strong open data commitments designed to foster greater transparency, generate economic growth, empower citizens, fight corruption and more generally enhance governance. In 2015 the Open Data Charter was founded in a multistakeholder process in order to establish principles for ‘how governments should be publishing information’. The Charter has been adopted by 17 national governments half of which were from Latin America and the Caribbean.

The 2017 Open Data Barometer, conducted by the World Wide Web Foundation, shows that while 79 out of the 115 countries surveyed have open government data portals, in most cases "the right policies are not in place, nor is the breadth and quality of the data-sets released sufficient". In general, the Open Data Barometer found that government data is usually "incomplete, out of date, of low quality, and fragmented".

==== Private bodies ====
As of 2006, the following 19 countries had freedom of information legislation that extended to government bodies and private bodies: Antigua and Barbuda, Angola, Armenia, Colombia, the Czech Republic, the Dominican Republic, Estonia, Finland, France, Iceland, Liechtenstein, Panama, Poland, Peru, South Africa, Turkey, Trinidad and Tobago, Slovakia, and the United Kingdom. The degree to which private bodies are covered under freedom of information legislation varies; in Angola, Armenia and Peru the legislation only applies to private companies that perform what are considered to be public functions. In the Czech Republic, the Dominican Republic, Finland, Trinidad and Tobago, Slovakia, Poland and Iceland private bodies that receive public funding are subject to freedom of information legislation. Freedom of information legislation in Estonia, France and UK covers private bodies in certain sectors. In South Africa the access provisions of the Promotion of Access to Information Act have been used by individuals to establish why their loan application has been denied. The access provisions have also been used by minority shareholders in private companies and environmental groups, who were seeking information on the potential environmental damage caused by company projects.

==== Consumer protection ====
In 1983, the United Nations Commission on Transnational Corporations adopted the United Nations Guidelines for Consumer Protection stipulating eight consumer rights, including "consumer access to adequate information to enable making informed choices according to individual wishes and needs". Access to information became regarded as a basic consumer right, and preventive disclosure, i.e. the disclosure of information on threats to human lives, health and safety, began to be emphasized.

==== Investors ====
Secretive decision-making by company directors and corporate scandals led to freedom of information legislation being published for the benefit of investors. Such legislation was first adopted in Britain in the early 20th century, and later in North America and other countries. Disclosure regimes for the benefit of investors regained attention at the beginning of the 21st century as a number of corporate scandals were linked to accounting fraud and company director secrecy. Starting with Enron, the subsequent scandals involving Worldcom, Tyco, Adelphia and Global Crossing prompted the US Congress to impose new information disclosure obligations on companies with the Sarbanes-Oxley Act 2002.

== See also ==
- Access to public information
- Action For Economic Reforms
- Anna's Archive
- Citizen oversight
- Criticism of copyright
- Crypto-anarchism
- Culture vs. Copyright
- Cypherpunk
- Digital rights
- Directorate-General for Information Society and Media (European Commission)
- Freedom of information laws by country
- Freedom of panorama
- Free-culture movement
- Free Haven Project
- Foundation for a Free Information Infrastructure
- Freenet
- Hacking
- Hacktivism
- Illegal number
- International Right to Know Day
- I2P
- Information
- Information activism
- Information commissioner
- Information ethics
- Information privacy
- Information wants to be free
- Intellectual freedom
- Intellectual property
- Internet censorship
- Internet freedom
- Internet privacy
- Market for loyalties theory
- Medical law
- Netsukuku
- Openness
- Open data
- Open Music Model
- Pirate Party
- Right to know
- Stop Online Piracy Act
- Tor (anonymity network)
- Transparency (humanities)
- Virtual private network

== Sources ==
Attribution

- This article incorporates text from a free content work. Licensed under CC BY SA 3.0 IGO (license statement/permission). Text taken from Keystones to foster inclusive Knowledge Societies. Access to information and knowledge, Freedom of Expression, Privacy, and Ethics on a Global Internet, 102, UNESCO.
- This article incorporates text from a free content work. Licensed under CC BY SA 3.0 IGO (license statement/permission). Text taken from World Trends in Freedom of Expression and Media Development Global Report, 202, UNESCO.
