= StegoShare =

- Developer(s): Digital Equality Foundation
- Stable release: v1.01 Stable / December 8, 2008
- Written in: Java
- Operating system: Cross-platform
- Type: Steganography, File sharing, Anonymous peer to peer
- License: GPL
- Website: http://stegoshare.sf.net

StegoShare is a steganography tool that allows embedding of large files into multiple images. It may be used for anonymous file sharing.

== Features ==
- Supports various image formats (png, jpg, bmp, gif, tiff etc.)
- Maximal supported hidden file's size is 2Gb, number of cover images in the set up to 65536
- Average capacity is 40% (a 100 Mb file could be embedded into a 250Mb image)
- 128-bit encryption
- Good output images quality (changes undetectable by human eye)

== Use in the file sharing networks ==
This software can be easily used for anonymous file sharing. An uploader downloads legal images from a public photo hosting site, and embeds the censored file into those images. The uploader then uploads pictures to the public photo torrent tracker and puts the links referencing the stego pictures with censored file's description on a forum or blog. Downloaders, seeders, and public photo trackers, if caught distributing illegal files, are protected from legal prosecution, because they can always use plausible deniability, saying that they knew nothing about the illicit file in the images. This is impossible to prove otherwise, as the human eye cannot differentiate between an ordinary image and a picture with hidden embedded file.

== Vulnerabilities ==
The cover file manipulation algorithm used is based on fixed location LSB insertion, making its output images detectable to most steganalysis software by a simply Histogram Characteristic Function.

== See also ==
- Steganography
- Anonymous p2p
- Plausible deniability
