= Girls' Generation (disambiguation) =

Girls' Generation is a South Korean idol girl group.

Girls' Generation may also refer to:

- "Girls' Generation" (song), a Korean song originally sung by Lee Seung-Cheol
- Girls' Generation (2007 album), the debut album of Girls' Generation
- Girls' Generation (2011 album), the debut Japanese language album of Girls' Generation

== See also ==
- SNSD (disambiguation)
