= LAIM Working Group =

The LAIM (Log Anonymization and Information Management) Working Group is a NSF and ONR funded research group at the National Center for Supercomputing Applications under the direction of Adam Slagell. Work from this group focuses upon log anonymization and Internet privacy. The LAIM group, established in 2005, has released 3 different log anonymization tools: CANINE, Scrub-PA, and FLAIM. FLAIM is their only tool still under active development.
