= P2PRIV =

Peer-to-peer direct and anonymous distribution overlay (P2PRIV) was a conceptual anonymous peer-to-peer overlay network introduced at Warsaw University of Technology in 2007. P2PRIV hides an initiator of communications by a parallelization of network nodes receiving or sending user data independently. This concept is contrary to other anonymity networks topologies. The anonymity networks employ a serial communication as a common basis and hide the initiator in a cascade of network nodes forwarding user data consecutively. The main advantage of P2PRIV is viewed as a possibility of providing high-speed anonymous data transfer while anonymous data can be sent directly and independently in the distributed network.

The last update on the web site was in 2009. The official web site is down since 2013.

== Description ==
P2PRIV separates anonymization from user data transport. Before sending data, signalization tokens are forwarded over classical anonymous cascades towards formation of so-called cloning cascades (CC). The well-known anonymous techniques (i.e. Mix network and Crowds' Random walk algorithm) are utilized in hiding the initiator of the CC. Then, after a random interval of time, each CC member (i.e. group of clones and the true initiator) communicates directly and independently with destination nodes. A process of finding the true initiator among network nodes is hard to perform even for an adversary able to collude a significant part of overlay network.

== Weaknesses ==
P2PRIV requires a fully distributed network with distributed information content to assure high-anonymous access to its resources. A utility of P2PRIV in client-server like services, e.g., World Wide Web system, or in hybrid P2P topologies, is problematic in its current form.

== See also ==
- Anonymous P2P
- Secure communication
- Overlay network
