= Bitblinder =

Open source software program

- Release: 2009
- Preview release: 0.6.2 / 2010
- Written in: Python
- Type: Onion routing
- License: MIT
- Website: www.bitblinder.com

Bitblinder was an open source software program that allows users to share bandwidth and IP addresses in order to anonymously download torrents and browse the internet. It was first released in June 2009, under an MIT open-source license. It was developed by Josh Albrecht and Matthew Kaniaris of Innominet. The software is based on the principles that Tor uses to create anonymity but was designed to be faster and encourage file sharing in addition to anonymous browsing. It currently comes bundled with an anonymous browser based on Mozilla Firefox and an anonymous BitTorrent client based on BitTornado. The software was planned to provide anonymity for instant messaging and Internet Relay Chat.

Usage of the software in beta testing was offered initially by invitation only. Features included a 4-step slider which allowed adjusting communication speed, traded off against anonymity. Users were allowed to transfer 3 gigabytes of data on the network initially; additional traffic could be earned by setting up one's computer as a relay server, or could be paid for. The 2010 review on DownloadSquad pointed out, "BitBlinder won't work without community participation: if there's no one online to help proxify torrent traffic." The software was listed as the "Download of the week" by MaximumPC in 2010.

As of 2012, BitBlinder appears to be defunct, as its web page and software client are no longer functional.

== See also ==
- Anonymous P2P
- I2P
- Tor (anonymity network)
