= AllPeers =

Browser extension for Mozilla Firefox

- Developer: AllPeers Ltd.
- Release: August 24, 2006
- Stable release: Non [±]
- Preview release: Non [±]
- Written in: ?
- Operating system: Cross-platform
- Available in: English
- Type: Mozilla Firefox P2P Extension
- License: Tri-licensed: MPL, GPL, LGPL
- Website: Official Site

AllPeers was a free software browser extension for Mozilla Firefox.

On March 2, 2008, AllPeers announced the end of the service.

The extension allowed building a social network and sharing files on a P2P basis. It used a darknet style of peer-to-peer communication; files and information shared between users are only accessible as long as the users have each other on their respective access lists - their 'trusted private network'. AllPeers beta version was launched on 24 August 2006. It worked on Windows, Linux and Mac, which, once downloaded, becomes a toolbar in Mozilla Firefox.

AllPeers used open source BitTorrent technology to facilitate file transfer. The extension did not require any ports to be opened. AllPeers encrypted its communication using standard protocols like SSL so as to protect the user against 3rd party intervention listening in. At its beta launch AllPeers comprised 200,000 lines of C++ and JavaScript code.

Although the AllPeers client was open sourced in March 2007, the server source remains closed. AllPeers claimed this was because the network must have a single, stable server instance to function reliably.

== See also ==
- BitTorrent
- List of Firefox extensions
- P2P
