= SNSD =

SNSD may also refer to:

- Alliance of Independent Social Democrats (Serbian: Савез независних социјалдемократа)
- Sonyeo Sidae (Girls' Generation), a South Korean girl group
- Smackover-Norphlet School District
- SNSD (netsukuku), Scattered Name Service Disgregation in the distributed hostname management system ANDNA
