= GigaTribe =

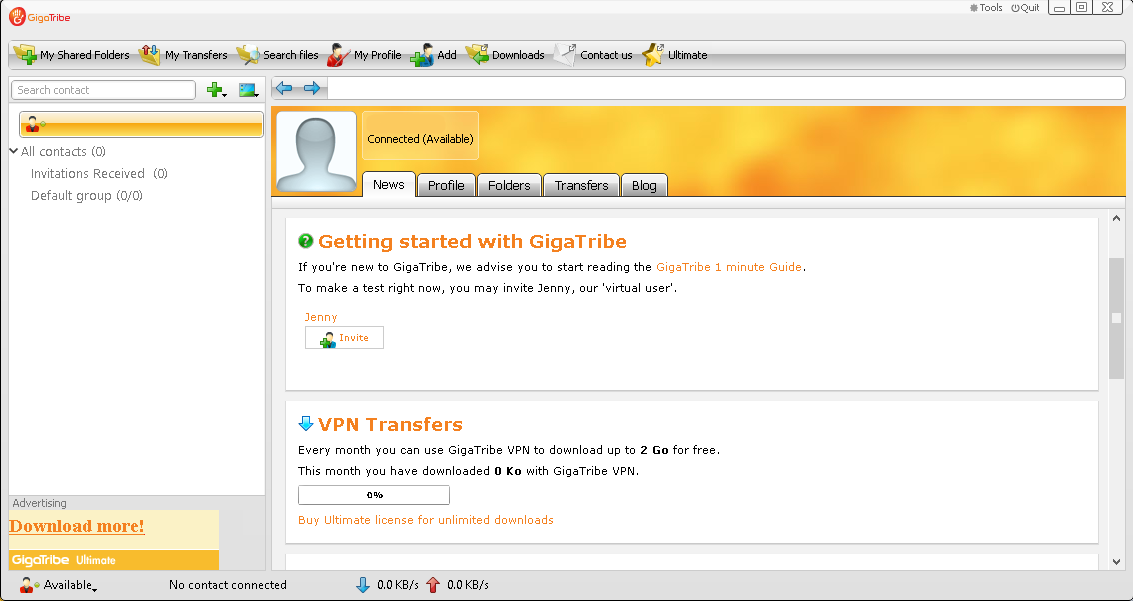
- Original author: GigaTribe company
- Release: 2005
- Stable release: 3.06.013 / Feb 19, 2024
- Operating system: Windows 2000/ XP/ Vista/ 7/ 8/ Mac/ Linux
- Size: ~50.6 Mb
- Available in: (fr), (en), (de), (es), (it), (pt)
- Type: Friend-to-friend peer-to-peer file sharing
- Website: www.gigatribe.com

GigaTribe is a peer-to-peer file-sharing network. Originally developed in France (2005), its American version was launched in November 2008. It offers free and paid versions; with the paid version users may restrict access to their encrypted files to a group of trusted friends.

In 2010, a U.S. federal judge ruled that reasonable expectation of privacy does not extend to GigaTribe file-sharing. In the case, an informant gave police access to his GigaTribe friends' files, and child pornography was subsequently discovered.

After some time, in 2015, GigaTribe announced collaborative storage with "GiGa.GG". They created a cloud service with a capability of sharing files with anyone by uploading them on the servers of the company. The amount of storage in free accounts was limited by 100 GB at first, but then, GiGa.GG decided to switch to a paid distribution model. Now, it is available to purchase an account with 100 GB, 1 TB or 2 TB (1.99 €, 5.99 € and 9.99 € respectively) with a possibility to get a free account for a month.

== History ==
GigaTribe has undergone many changes. Initially, the software was known as TribalWeb until 2.4.4.0, which was then followed with the redesign of the product in 3.00.002. Many updated versions have been released over the years, including the newer Mac and Linux versions. As of May 2020, the latest version (3.06.004) runs on the three main operating system series (Windows – MacOS – Linux) and now enables users to find other users with similar interests (via the recent introduction of # hashtags).

== Design ==
In GigaTribe, there is a P2P connection between users, however the files are not being shared in public. You can choose to whom you need to send the files and they will be transferred directly to the computer of that particular user. Files may go through the servers of GigaTribe company (if VPN connection is chosen), but they are still being encrypted on the way to the receiver.

== API ==
Gigatribe API is a collection of HTTP GET/POST services exposing Gigatribe functions to developers. The purpose is to help developers build their Gigatribe applications with less effort. The applications will be able to perform inviting users, joining tribes, reading contacts information, etc, outside the desktop version of Gigatribe software, for example, in a web forum. So as to enable developers to compose less code to call an API, GigaTribe team developed a customer library, which embodied the code for requesting for authorization code, access token and the code for calling an API, that works on PHP.

In terms of security, these services use OAuth 2.0, which is an open-standard protocol for authorization.
