= Vidalia (software) =

Graphical controller for Tor software

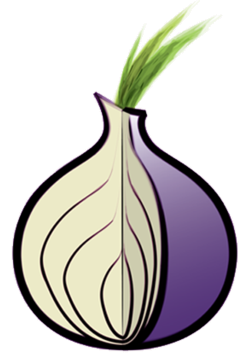

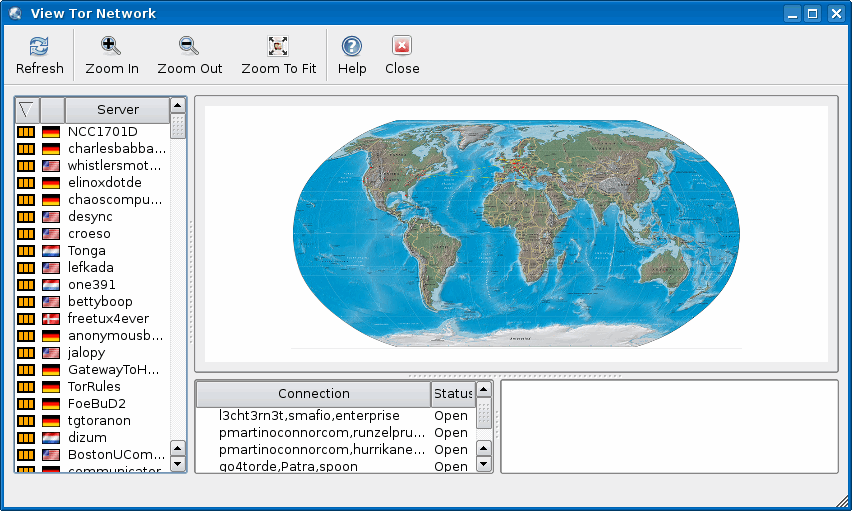
- Vidalia showing a network map
- Original authors: Matt Edman, Justin Hipple
- Developer: Tomás Touceda
- Initial release: 28 February 2006; 19 years ago
- Final release: 0.2.21 (3 December 2012; 13 years ago) [±]
- Preview release: 0.3.1 alpha (27 February 2012; 13 years ago) [±] ШкиЛ
- Written in: C++, Qt
- Operating system: OS X, Microsoft Windows, Unix-like
- Available in: 30 languages
- List of languages Arabic, Basque, Brazilian Portuguese, Bulgarian, Burmese, Catalan, Chinese (simplified), Croatian, Czech, Danish, Dutch, Finnish, French, German, Greek, Hebrew, Hungarian, Indonesian, Italian, Korean, Norwegian, Persian, Polish, Portuguese, Romanian, Russian, Serbian, Spanish, Swedish, Turkish
- Type: Anonymity, GUI
- License: GNU GPL v2 (with OpenSSL exception)
- Website: www.torproject.org/projects/vidalia.html

Vidalia is a discontinued cross-platform GUI for controlling Tor, built using Qt. The name comes from the Vidalia onion since Tor uses onion routing. It allows the user to start, stop or view the status of Tor, view, filter or search log messages, monitor bandwidth usage, and configure some aspects of Tor. Vidalia also makes it easier to contribute to the Tor network by optionally helping the user set up a Tor relay.

Another prominent feature of Vidalia is its Tor network map, which lets the user see the geographic location of relays on the Tor network, as well as where the user's application traffic is going.

== Release ==
Vidalia is released under the GNU General Public License. It runs on any platform supported by Qt 4.2, including Windows, Mac OS X, and Linux or other Unix-like variants using the X11 window system.

Vidalia is no longer maintained or supported, and Tor developers do not recommend its use anymore. In 2013, it was replaced with a Firefox-based Tor controller called Tor Launcher.

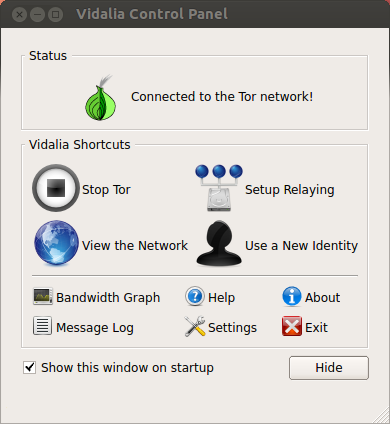
Vidalia control panel

== See also ==
- Anonymizing Relay Monitor (arm)
