= YouHaveDownloaded =

Experimental web platform

YouHaveDownloaded.com
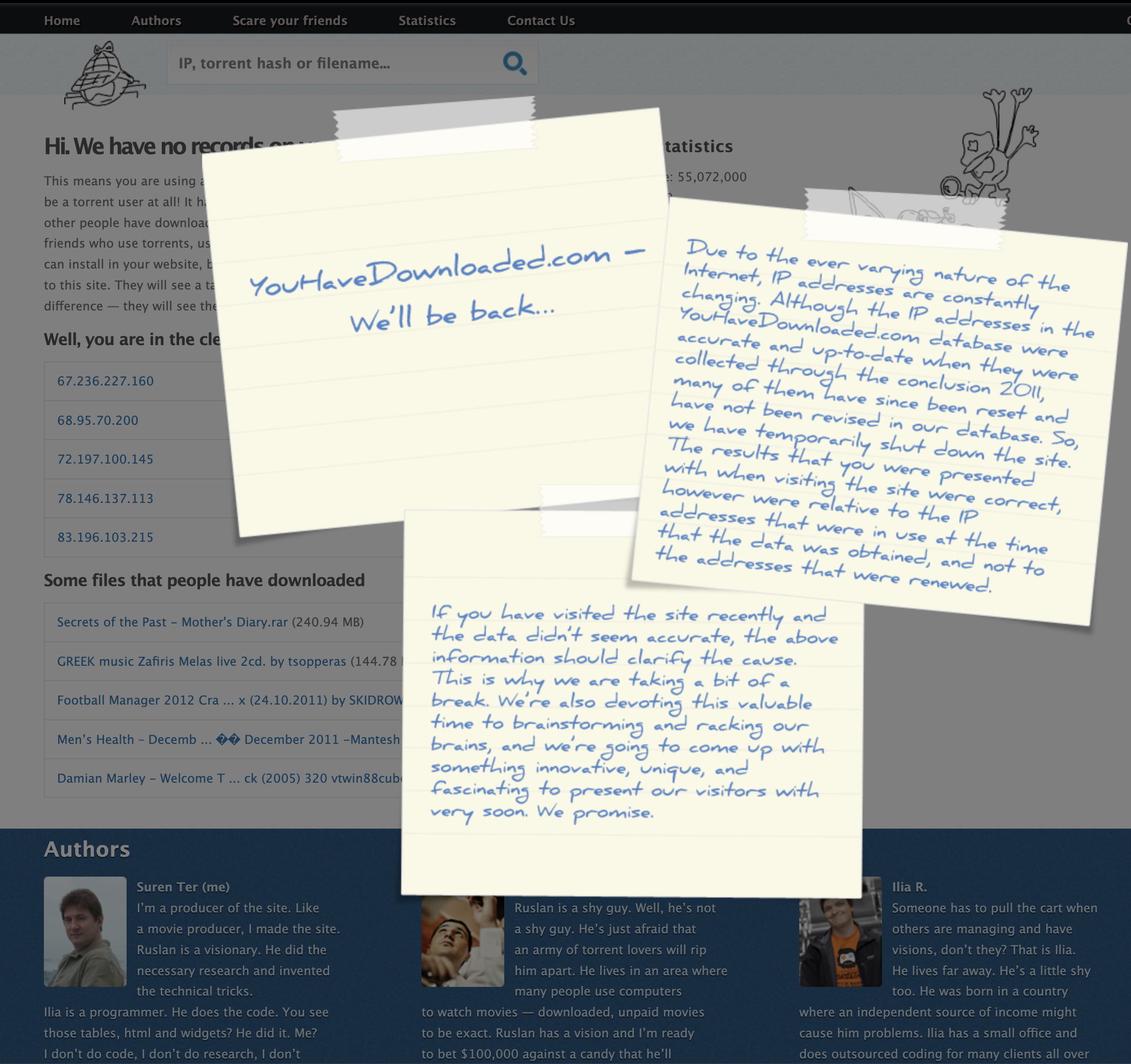
- Website type: Torrent activity indexing
- Available in: English, Armenian
- Dissolved: 2013
- Founder: Suren Ter-Saakov
- Revenue: None
- Website: youhavedownloaded.com Archived from the original on 2011-12-21
- Commercial: No
- Registration: None
- Launched: December 2011
- Current status: Offline

YouHaveDownloaded was an experimental web-based platform launched in December 2011 that allowed users to enter an IP address and view a list of torrent files recently downloaded from that address. The site quickly gained international attention as a provocative demonstration of how publicly available BitTorrent network data could be used to expose users' online behaviour.

== Functionality ==
The platform has been operated by collecting data from the public BitTorrent ecosystem, including: Distributed Hash Table (DHT) nodes and Public trackers.

The system matched IP addresses to .torrent files. It did not log actual file contents or timestamps, limited by known limitations: dynamic IP address reassignment, use of VPNs or proxies and carrier-grade NAT.

Despite these limitations, the system indexed over 50 million IP addresses, which was estimated to cover over 20 per cent of all global torrent activity at its peak. The service ran on a single server and cost less than $300/month to operate.

== History ==
A small team of three developers led by Suren Ter-Saakov created the website.

"The whole thing started with a theoretical discussion I had with some friends about what is possible to track..."

— S.Ter-Saakov, KrebsOnSecurity

=== Élysée Palace Incident ===
In one of the most high-profile incidents, journalists discovered that an IP address associated with the Élysée Palace, the residence of French President Nicolas Sarkozy, appeared in the database. The IP was linked to downloads of music by The Beach Boys and several comedy films. This was controversial, as the French government was a vocal proponent of anti-piracy legislation, including the HADOPI law.

=== U.S. Congressional Offices Incident ===
In early 2012, media coverage revealed that IP addresses linked to U.S. Congressional offices appeared in public torrent activity datasets, including stations indexed by YouHaveDownloaded.com. The reports suggested these addresses were associated with downloads of copyrighted content. The incident raised questions given lawmakers' roles in drafting anti-piracy legislation.

== Legacy ==
The site went offline in 2012 but was referenced in discussions about internet privacy, surveillance, and peer-to-peer transparency.

Similar platforms appeared after YouHaveDownloaded.com, also providing torrent activity linked to IP addresses based on public BitTorrent data. Discussions on forums like HiFiVision and WildersSecurity further confirm ongoing indexing efforts of IP‑torrent mapping derived from public trackers and DHT networks.

== See also ==
- Online anonymity
- Digital rights
- Mass surveillance in the United States
- HADOPI law
- SOPA / PIPA
