= StealthNet =

Anonymous darknet file sharing software

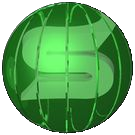
- Developer: Planet Peer community members
- Release: 2007
- Stable release: 0.8.7.9 / 13 March 2011
- Written in: C#
- Operating system: Windows, Linux (GUI with Wine otherwise CLI)
- Type: File sharing, Anonymous peer to peer
- License: GNU GPL
- Website: www.stealthnet.de

StealthNet is an anonymous P2P file sharing software based on the original RShare client, and has been enhanced. It was first named 'RShare CE' (RShare Community Edition). It uses the same network and protocols as RShare.

In 2011 a fork named DarkNode was released, but one year later the website is cleared with the source code.

== History ==
Development was stopped in March 2011, with version 0.8.7.9, with no official explanation on the web site.

In 2012, the developers had an incident with the software Apache Subversion, a part of the source code of StealthNet was lost : versions 0.8.7.5 (February 2010) to 0.8.7.9 (October 2010). However the source code is still available as files.

In 2017 it was forked into version 0.8.8.0.

== Features ==
Some of the features of StealthNet:

- Mix network (use for the pseudo anonymous process)
- Easy to use (same principles as eMule)
- Multi-source download : 'Swarming' (Segmented file transfer)
- Resumption of interrupted downloads
- Can filter the file types searched (allowing to search only among the videos/archives/musics/... files)
- SNCollection: this type of file contain a list of files shared into StealthNet. Like the "eMule collection" file and Torrents files
- Point-to-Point traffic encryption with AES standard process (Advanced Encryption Standard, 256 bits)
- EndPoint to EndPoint traffic encryption with RSA standard (1024 bits)
- Strong file hashes based on SHA-512 algorithm
- Anti-flooding measures
- Text mode client available for OS with Mono support like Linux, OSX and others

== Drawbacks ==
- Has no support for UPnP (Universal Plug and Play), the user must open a port number (ie: 6097) into his router.
- Anonymity is unproven. An earlier version allowed for full deanonymization of users.
- The source code contains no documentation at all.
- The encryption level (AES 256 bits and RSA 1024 bits in the v0.8.7.9) that was strong in the 2000s is now medium since the 2010s.

== See also ==
- Anonymous P2P
- I2P
