= Free Haven Project =

The Free Haven Project was formed in 1999 by a group of Massachusetts Institute of Technology students with the aim to develop a secure, decentralized system of data storage. The group's work led to a collaboration with the United States Naval Research Laboratory to develop Tor, funded by DARPA.

== Distributed anonymous storage system ==
The Project's early work focused on an anonymous storage system, Free Haven, which was designed to ensure the privacy and security of both readers and publishers. It contrasts Free Haven to anonymous publishing services to emphasize persistence rather than accessibility. Free Haven is a distributed peer-to-peer system designed to create a "servnet" consisting of "servnet nodes" which each hold fragments ("shares") of documents, divided using Rabin's Information dispersal algorithm such that the publisher or file contents cannot be determined by any one piece. The shares are stored on the servnet along with a unique public key. To recover and recreate the file, a client broadcasts the public key to find fragments, which are sent to the client along anonymous routes. For greater security, Free Haven periodically moves the location of shares between nodes.

Its function is similar to Freenet but with greater focus on persistence to ensure unpopular files do not disappear. The mechanisms that enable this persistence, however, are also the cause of some problems with inefficiency. A referral- or recommendation-based "metatrust" reputation system built into the servnet attempts to ensure reciprocity and information value by holding node operators accountable. Although nodes remain pseudonymous, communication is facilitated between operators through anonymous email.

== Work with Tor ==
Tor was developed by the US Naval Research Laboratory and the Free Haven Project to secure government communications, with initial funding from the US Office of Naval Research and DARPA. Tor was deployed in 2003, as their third generation of deployed onion routing designs. In 2005, the Electronic Frontier Foundation provided additional funding to the Free Haven Project. In 2006, the Tor Project was incorporated as a non-profit organization.
