= OneSwarm =

Computer service for Microsoft Windows

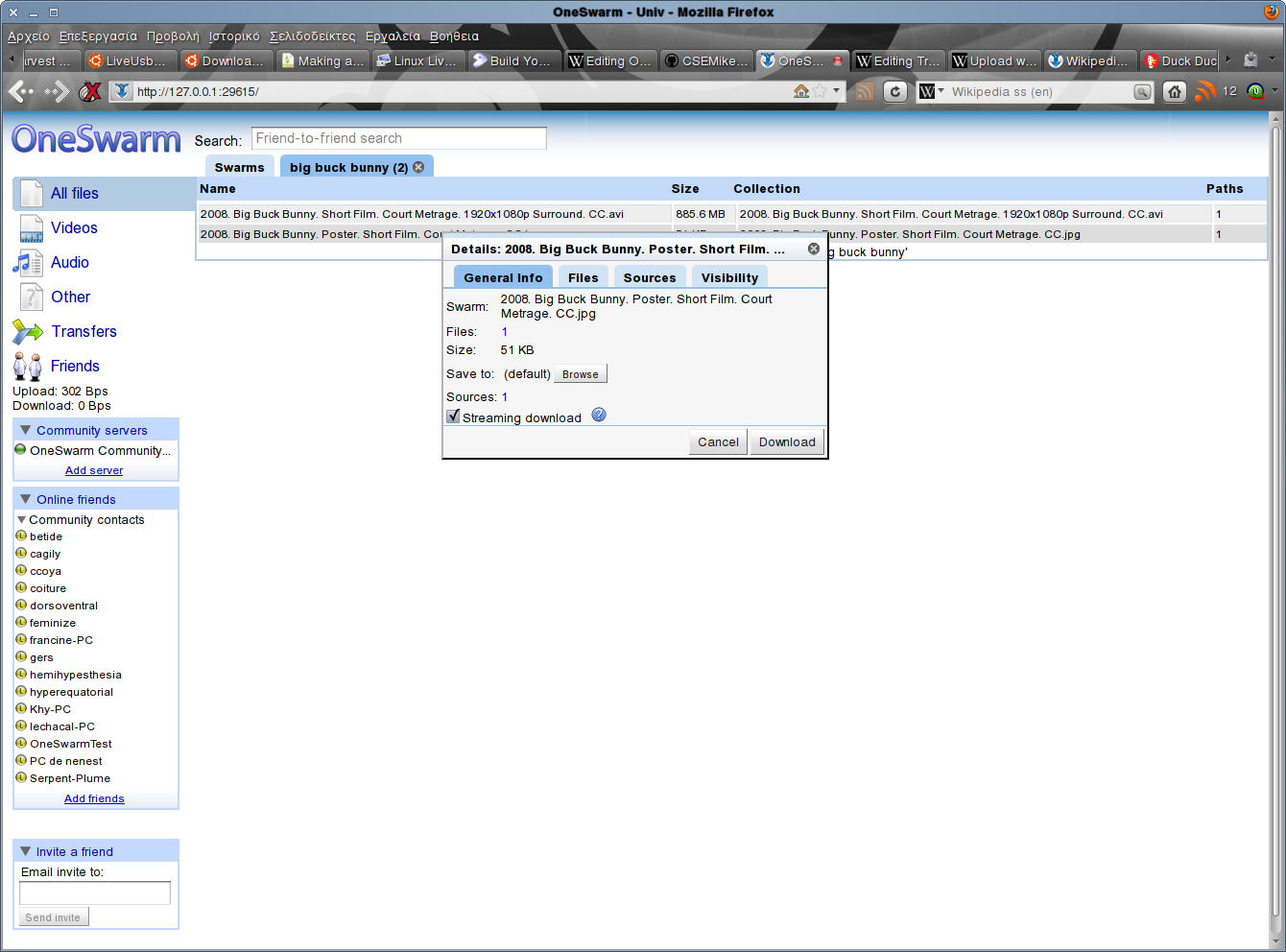
- Screenshot
- Written in: Java
- Type: BitTorrent client
- License: GPL v2
- Website: www.oneswarm.org
- Repository: github.com/CSEMike/OneSwarm

OneSwarm is a free and open-source file sharing software that uses the BitTorrent protocol to share files anonymously between users. One of the features is the ability to access the Dark Web.
