= Friend-to-friend =

Type of peer-to-peer network

A friend-to-friend (F2F) computer network is a type of peer-to-peer network in which users only make direct connections with people they know. Passwords or digital signatures can be used for authentication.

Unlike other kinds of private P2P, users in a friend-to-friend network cannot find out who else is participating beyond their own circle of friends, so F2F networks can grow in size without compromising their users' anonymity. Retroshare, WASTE, GNUnet, Freenet and OneSwarm are examples of software that can be used to build F2F networks, though RetroShare is the only one of these configured for friend-to-friend operation by default.

Many F2F networks support indirect anonymous or pseudonymous communication between users who do not know or trust one another. For example, a node in a friend-to-friend overlay can automatically forward a file (or a request for a file) anonymously between two friends, without telling either of them the other's name or IP address. These friends can in turn automatically forward the same file (or request) to their own friends, and so on.

Dan Bricklin coined the term "friend-to-friend network" in 2000.

== Potential applications of F2F ==
- The Bouillon project uses a friend-to-friend network to assign trust ratings to messages.

== See also ==
- Darknet
- LAN messenger
- Private peer-to-peer
- Web of trust
