= RetroShare =

Free software

Retroshare

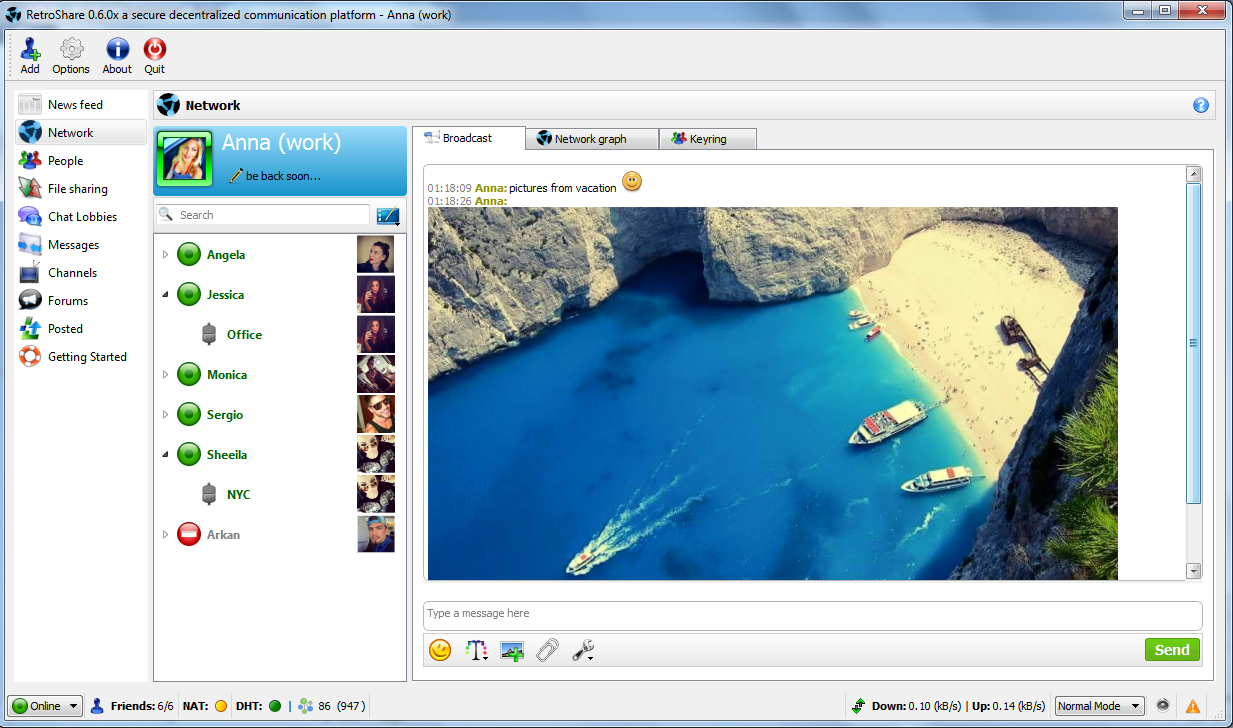
- Original author: Robert Fernie
- Developers: Cyril Soler; Gioacchino Mazzurco
- Release: 2006; 20 years ago
- Stable release: 0.6.7 / 30 November 2023
- Written in: C++
- Operating system: Linux, Windows, macOS, Android, FreeBSD, OpenBSD, NetBSD, Haiku
- Platform: Cross-platform
- Available in: 38 languages
- List of languages English, Arabic, Bulgarian, Catalan (Spain), Chinese (China), Chinese (Taiwan), Czech, Danish, Dutch, Estonian, Finnish, French, Galician (Spain), German, Greek, Hebrew, Hungarian, Indonesian, Italian, Japanese, Korean, Macedonian, Malayalam, Norwegian Bokmål, Occitan, Polish, Portuguese, Portuguese (Brazil), Portuguese (Portugal), Romanian, Russian, Serbian, Slovenian, Spanish, Swedish, Turkish, Ukrainian, Vietnamese
- Type: Anonymous P2P, friend-to-friend, chat, instant messaging, newsgroups, voice over IP, email client and BBS
- License: GNU General Public License
- Website: retroshare.cc
- Repository: github.com/RetroShare

Retroshare is a free and open-source peer-to-peer communication and file sharing app based on a friend-to-friend network built by GNU Privacy Guard (GPG). Optionally peers may exchange certificates and IP addresses with their friends and vice versa.

== History ==
Retroshare was founded in 2004 by Mark Fernie. An unofficial build for the single-board computer Raspberry Pi, named PiShare, was available since 2012.

On 4 November 2014, Retroshare scored 6 out of 7 points on the Electronic Frontier Foundation's secure messaging scorecard, which is now out-of-date. It lost a point because there had not been a recent independent code audit.

In August 2015, Retroshare repository was migrated from SourceForge to GitHub. In 2016, Linux Magazine reviewed security gaps in Retroshare and described it as "a brave effort, but in the end, an ineffective one."

== Design ==
Retroshare is an instant messaging and file-sharing network that uses a distributed hash table for address discovery. Users can communicate indirectly through mutual friends and request direct connections.

== Features ==
=== Authentication and connectivity ===
After initial installation, the user generates a pair of (GPG) cryptographic keys with Retroshare. After authentication and exchanging an asymmetric key, OpenSSL is used to establish a connection, and for end-to-end encryption. Friends of friends cannot connect by default, but they can see each other, if the users allow it. IPv6 was released in November 2018.

=== File sharing ===
It is possible to share folders between friends. File transfer is carried on using a multi-hop swarming system (inspired by the "Turtle Hopping" feature from the Turtle F2F project, but implemented differently). In essence, data is only exchanged between friends, although it is possible that the ultimate source and destination of a given transfer are multiple friends apart. A search function performing anonymous multi-hop search is another source of finding files in the network.

Files are represented by their SHA-1 hash value, and HTTP-compliant file and links may be exported, copied, and pasted into/out of Retroshare to publish their virtual location into the Retroshare network.

=== Communication ===
Retroshare offers the following services for communication:

- a private chat;
- a private mailing system that allows secure communication between known friends and distant friends;
- public and private multi-user chat lobbies;
- a forum system allowing both anonymous and authenticated forums, which distributes posts from friends to friends;
- a channel system offers the possibility to auto-download files posted in a given channel to every subscribed peer, similar to RSS feeds;
- a posted links system, where links to important information can be shared;
- VoIP calls;
- Video calls (since version 0.6.0);
- Tor and I2P networks support, for further anonymisation (since version 0.6.0).

=== User interface ===
The core of the Retroshare software is based on an offline library, into which two executables are plugged:

- a command-line interface executable which offers nearly no control, but it is useful to run "headless" on a server
- a graphical user interface written in Qt is the one most users use. In addition to functions quite common to other file-sharing software, such as a search tab and visualization of transfers, Retroshare gives users the potential to manage their network by collecting optional information about neighbouring friends and visualizing it as a trust matrix or as a dynamic network graph. The appearance can be changed by choosing one of several available style sheets.

=== Anonymity ===
The friend-to-friend structure of the Retroshare network makes it difficult to intrude and hardly possible to monitor from an external point of view. The degree of anonymity may be improved further by deactivating the DHT and IP/certificate exchange services, making the Retroshare network a real dark net.

Friends of friends may not connect directly with each other; however, a user may enable the anonymous sharing of files with friends of friends. Search, access, and both upload and download of these files are made by "routing" through a series of friends. This means that communication between the source of data (the up-loader) and the destination of the data (the down-loader) is indirect through mutual friends. Although the intermediary friends cannot determine the original source or ultimate destination, they can see their very next links in the communication chain (their friends). Since the data stream is encrypted, only the original source and ultimate destination are able to see what data is transferred.

== Caveats ==
While Retroshare's encryption makes it virtually impossible for an ISP or another external observer to know what one is downloading or uploading, this limitation does not apply to members of the user's Retroshare circle of trust; adding untrusted people to it may be a potential risk.

In 2012, a German Court granted an injunction against a user of Retroshare for sharing copyrighted music files. Retroshare derives its security from the fact that all transfers should go through “trusted friends” whom users add. In this case, the defendant added the anti-piracy monitoring company as a friend, which allowed him to be traced through aggregation of bad Opsec.

== See also ==
- Comparison of file-sharing applications
