= I2P =

Free and open source project building an anonymous network

- Original author: I2P Team
- Release: 2003; 23 years ago
- Stable release: 2.14.1 / 6 November 2026; 2 days ago
- Written in: Java
- Operating system: Cross-platform: Unix-like (Android, Linux, BSD, macOS), Microsoft Windows
- Available in: 62 languages: Albanian; Arabic; Armenian; Asturian; Azerbaijani; Bengali; Bosnian; Breton; Bulgarian; Catalan; Chinese (China, Gan, Taiwan); Croatian; Czech; Danish; Dutch; Estonian (Estonia); Filipino; Finnish; French; Galician; German; Greek; Hebrew; Hindi; Hungarian; Icelandic; Indonesian; Italian; Japanese; Korean; Kurdish; Lithuanian; Macedonian; Malagasy; Mongolian; Norwegian (Bokmål, Nynorsk); Occitan (post 1500); Oromo; Persian; Polish; Portuguese (Europe, Brazil); Romanian; Russian (Russia); Serbian; Sinhala; Slovak; Slovenian; Spanish (Europe, Argentina); Swedish (Sweden); Tagalog; Thai; Turkish (Turkey); Turkmen; Ukrainian (Ukraine); Urdu; Vietnamese; Yoruba
- Type: Anonymity application, Overlay network, mix network, garlic router, peer-to-peer
- License: Public domain, BSD, GPL, MIT (license varies by component)
- Website: i2p.net
- Repository: github.com/i2p/i2p.i2p

The Invisible Internet Project (I2P) is an anonymous network layer (implemented as a mix network) that allows for censorship-resistant, peer-to-peer communication. Anonymous connections are achieved by encrypting the user's traffic (by using end-to-end encryption), and sending it through a volunteer-run network of roughly 55,000 computers distributed around the world. Given the high number of possible paths the traffic can transit, a third party watching a full connection is unlikely. The software that implements this layer is called an "I2P router", and a computer running I2P is called an "I2P node". I2P is free and open source, and is published under multiple licenses.

== Technical design ==
I2P started in 2003 as a fork of Hyphanet, then known as Freenet.

The network is strictly message-based, like IP, but a library is available to allow reliable streaming communication on top of it (similar to Non-blocking IO-based TCP, although from version 0.6, a new Secure Semi-reliable UDP transport is used). All communication is end-to-end encrypted through garlic routing, and even the end points ("destinations") are cryptographic identifiers (essentially a pair of public keys), so that neither senders nor recipients of messages need to reveal their IP address to the other side or to third-party observers.

Although many developers had been a part of the Invisible IRC Project (IIP) and Freenet communities, significant differences exist between their designs and concepts. IIP was an anonymous centralized IRC server. Freenet/Hyphanet is a censorship-resistant distributed data store. I2P is an anonymous peer-to-peer distributed communication layer designed to run any traditional internet service (e.g., Usenet, email, IRC, file sharing, Web hosting and HTTP, or Telnet), as well as more traditional distributed applications (e.g., a distributed data store, a Web proxy network using Squid, or DNS). Although I2P is decentralized, it remains vulnerable to address-based blocking by censors operating only a small number of routers. A study in 2018 showed that a censor could block access to over 95% of known peers using only 10 strategically placed routers.

Many developers of I2P are known only under pseudonyms. While the previous main developer, jrandom, is currently on hiatus, others, such as zzz, killyourtv, and Complication have continued to lead development efforts, and are assisted by numerous contributors.

I2P can use a wide variety of cryptographic protocols, with 2048-bit ElGamal/AES256/SHA256+Session Tags encryption and Ed25519 EdDSA/ECDSA signatures being the default options for services. Starting in version 2.10.0, a hybrid-PQ scheme of MLKEM+X25519 for symmetric encryption in some services is being rolled-out in testing and required to be implemented within I2P implementations, but an individual user must manually switch it from classical defaults.

=== Releases ===
I2P has had a stable release every six to eight weeks. Updates are distributed via I2P torrents and are signed by the release manager (generally str4d or zzz (Note: stepped back after the 2.1.0 release)).

I2P Versions

Version	Release date	Release notes
0.9.11	2014-02-08	Support for outproxy plugins, improves lease set lookup security, and reduces memory usage.
0.9.12	2014-03-31	Support for ECDSA and updates to Jetty 8.
0.9.13	2014-05-22	SusiMail improvements and fixes for firewalled router.
0.9.14	2014-07-26	Critical fixes for XSS and remote execution vulnerabilities.
0.9.14.1	2014-08-09	I2PSnark and console fixes.
0.9.15	2014-09-20	Preliminary support for Ed25519 EdDSA signatures.
0.9.16	2014-11-01	Add support for stronger Router Info signatures.
0.9.17	2014-11-30	Signed news, ECDSA tunnels by default.
0.9.18	2015-02-22	Shortened the startup time, and reduced latency throughout our network protocols.
0.9.19	2015-04-12	Several fixes and improvements for floodfill performance.
0.9.20	2015-06-02	Important bug fixes, and several changes to increase floodfill capacity in the network.
0.9.21	2015-07-31	Contains several changes to add capacity to the network, increase the efficiency of the floodfills, and use bandwidth more effectively.
0.9.22	2015-09-12	Fixes for I2PSnark getting stuck before completion, and begins the migration of router infos to new, stronger Ed25519 signatures.
0.9.23	2015-11-19	Accelerates the rekeying process.
0.9.24	2016-01-27	A new version of SAM (v3.2) and numerous bug fixes and efficiency improvements. The first release to require Java 7.
0.9.25	2016-03-22	A new version of SAM (v3.3), QR codes for sharing hidden services, identicons and router families.
0.9.26	2016-06-07	Major upgrade to the native crypto library, a new addressbook subscription protocol with signatures, and major improvements to the Debian/Ubuntu packaging.
0.9.27	2016-10-17	Improvements in IPv6 transports, SSU peer testing, and hidden mode.
0.9.28	2016-12-12	Updates for a number of bundled software, fixes for IPv6 peer testing, improvements to detect and block potentially malicious peers. Preliminary fixes for Java 9.
0.9.29	2017-02-27	Support for NTP over IPv6, preliminary Docker support, translated main pages. We now pass same-origin Referrer headers through the HTTP proxy. There are more fixes for Java 9, although we do not yet recommend Java 9 for general use.
0.9.30	2017-05-03	Support for Debian Stretch and Ubuntu Zesty, upgraded to Jetty 9 and Tomcat 8, support for the migration of old DSA-SHA1 hidden services to the EdDSA signature type.
0.9.31	2017-08-07	Refreshed the router console to improve readability, improved accessibility and cross-browser support, and general tidying up.
0.9.32	2017-11-07	0.9.32 contains a number of fixes in the router console and associated webapps (addressbook, i2psnark, and susimail). We have also changed the way we handle configured hostnames for published router infos, to eliminate some network enumeration attacks via DNS. Added some checks in the console to resist rebinding attacks.
0.9.33	2018-01-30	0.9.33 contains bug fixes for i2psnark, i2ptunnel, streaming, and SusiMail. Updates for reseed proxying, and default rate limiting.
0.9.34	2018-04-10	0.9.34 contains bug fixes for i2ptunnel, router console, SusiMail, routing and transport along with Changes to SusiMail and UPnP.
0.9.35	2018-06-26	0.9.35 adds support for folders in SusiMail, and a new SSL Wizard for setting up HTTPS on your Hidden Service website.
0.9.36	2018-08-23	0.9.36 implements a new, more secure transport protocol called NTCP2. It is disabled by default, but you may enable it for testing. NTCP2 will be enabled in the next release.
0.9.37	2018-10-04	0.9.37 enables the faster, more secure transport protocol called NTCP2.
0.9.38	2019-01-22	0.9.38 includes a new first-install wizard with a bandwidth tester. We've added support for the latest GeoIP database format. There's a new Firefox profile installer and a new, native Mac OSX installer on our website. Work continues on supporting the new "LS2" netdb format.
0.9.39	2019-03-21	0.9.39 includes extensive changes for the new network database types (proposal 123). We've bundled the i2pcontrol plugin as a webapp to support development of RPC applications. There are numerous performance improvements and bug fixes.
0.9.40	2019-05-07	0.9.40 includes support for the new encrypted leaseset format. We disabled the old NTCP 1 transport protocol. There's a new SusiDNS import feature, and a new scripted filtering mechanism for incoming connections.
0.9.41	2019-07-02	0.9.41 continues the work to implement new features for proposal 123, including per-client authentication for encrypted leasesets. The console has an updated I2P logo and several new icons. We've updated the Linux installer.
0.9.42	2019-08-28	0.9.42 continues the work to make I2P faster and more reliable. It includes several changes to speed up our UDP transport. We have split up the configuration files to enable future work for more modular packaging. We continue work to implement new proposals for faster and more secure encryption. There are, of course, a lot of bug fixes also.
0.9.43	2019-10-22	0.9.43 release continues work on stronger security and privacy features and performance improvements. Our implementation of the new leaseset specification (LS2) is now complete. We are beginning our implementation of stronger and faster end-to-end encryption (proposal 144) for a future release. Several IPv6 address detection issues have been fixed, and there of course are several other bug fixes.
0.9.44	2019-12-01	0.9.44 contains an important fix for a denial of service issue in hidden services handling of new encryption types.
0.9.45	2020-02-25	0.9.45 contains bug fixes.
0.9.46	2020-05-25	0.9.46 contains new ECIES Encryption.
0.9.47	2020-08-24	0.9.47 enables new encryption for some services, now requires Java 8 and Sybil analysis and blocking is now enabled by default.
0.9.48	2020-11-30	0.9.48 enables new encryption for most services, has significant performance improvements.
0.9.49	2021-02-17	0.9.49 improves SSU transport and begins transition to X25519 encryption for routers.
0.9.50	2021-05-17	0.9.50 continues transition to X25519 encryption for routers, enables DoH for reseeding and improves support for IPv6.
1.5.0	2021-08-23	1.5.0 adds short tunnel build messages, continues transition to X25519 encryption for routers and improves performance.
1.6.1	2021-11-29	1.6.1 (Note: tagged as 1.6.0) further accelerates transition to X25519 for routers, enables short tunnel build messages and improves SSU performance.
1.7.0	2022-02-21	1.7.0 improves performance and reliability.
1.8.0	2022-05-23	1.8.0 fixes bugs and adds experimental SSU2 support.
1.9.0	2022-08-22	1.9.0 improves SSU2 support and enables it on Android and ARM devices.
2.0.0	2022-11-21	2.0.0 enables SSU2 for all users and adds RFC 7616 support.
2.1.0	2023-01-09	2.1.0 fixes rare implementation bugs with SSU2 and adds torsocks support.
2.2.0	2023-03-13	2.2.0 adds mitigations for DDOS attacks across the NetDB, Floodfill, and Peer-Selection components. zzz also stepped back as one of the lead maintainers.
2.2.1	2023-04-12	2.2.1 fixes packaging issues created by the previous release and updates components.
2.3.0	2023-06-25	2.3.0 fixes CVE-2023-36325 (context-confusion bug which occurred in the bloom filter), adds mitigations to prevent such issues, adds notbob.i2p and ramble.i2p to the console homepage and allows users to override blocklist expiration with an interval.
2.4.0	2023-12-18	2.4.0 adds DDOS mitigations to NetDB and disables SSU1 support.
2.5.0	2023-12-18	2.5.0 improves compatibility with other Bittorrent clients like qBittorrent.
2.5.1	2024-05-06	2.5.1 adds more mitigations against then ongoing DDOS attacks.
2.5.2	2024-05-15	2.5.2 fixes a bug that truncates HTTP responses.
2.6.0	2024-07-19	2.6.0 increases the minimum version for floodfill routers and disables I2P over Tor.
2.6.1	2024-08-06	2.6.1 fixes a User-Interface bug in the Hidden Services Manager application.
2.7.0	2024-10-09	2.7.0 fixes bugs and improves performance.
2.8.0	2025-02-03	2.8.0 fixes bugs and improves network stability.
2.8.1	2025-03-17	2.8.1 fixes accesses to local sites that were broken in 2.8.0.
2.8.2	2025-03-29	2.8.2 fixes a bug causing SHA256 failures that was introduced in the 2.8.1 release.
2.9.0	2025-03-29	2.9.0 brings general improvements.
2.10.0	2025-03-29	2.10.0 adds support for UDP trackers.
2.11.0	2026-02-09	Minimal Java version is now 17. Improved post-quantum cryptography.
2.12.0	2026-04-20	2.12.0 improved post-quantum cryptography.
2.13.0	2026-7-24	2.13.0 improved post quantum cryptography, removed SSU1.
Legend: Unsupported Supported Latest version Preview version Future version

== Funding ==
The website had stated that "funding for I2P comes entirely from donations" in 2022. Admins and managers of the project said that "the core project itself doesn't take donations. These should instead go to secondary applications or be spent on hiring others, to work on I2P." Support for the onboarding for I2P came from the Open Technology Fund. In 2022, in contrast to The Tor Project, I2P had "not the financial or legal infrastructure to support a network of exit nodes". The reseed servers, a sort of bootstrap nodes, which connect the user with the initial set of peers to join the I2P-network, should be run by volunteers.

In 2025, the American nonprofit StormyCloud formally invited the I2P developer idk to its board of directors after having performed technical support for I2P infrastructure "for years". StormyCloud announced that it would take financial support regarding I2P in the form of cryptocurrencies and fiat which would be used on I2P related projects and infrastructure. idk in the announcement post claimed that the deal would not affect development practices or the philosophy of the team.

== Software ==
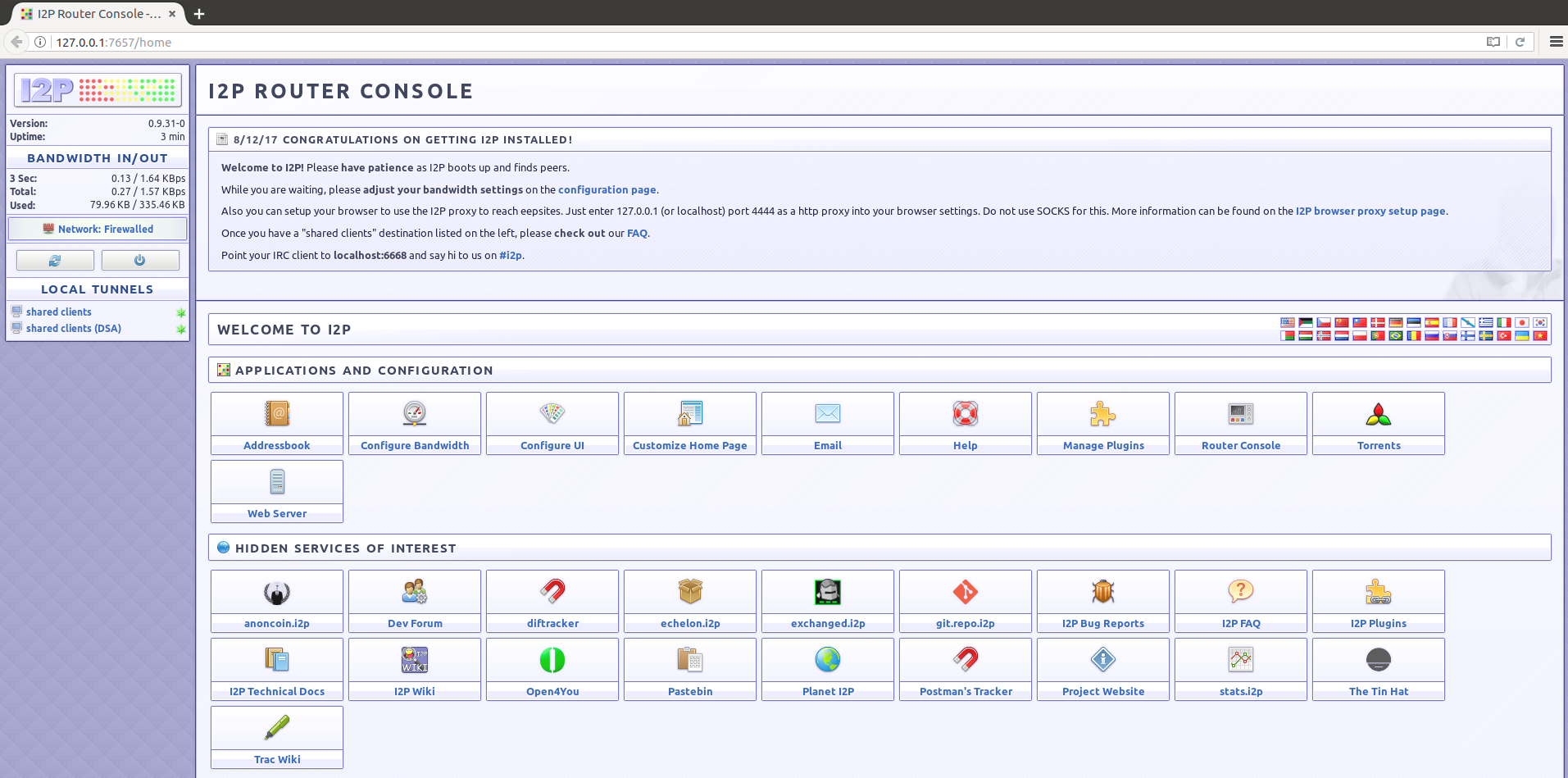
I2P 0.9.31-0 router console

Since I2P is an anonymizing network layer, it is designed so other software can use it for anonymous communication. As such, there are a variety of tools currently available for I2P or in development.

The I2P router is controlled through the router console, which is a web frontend accessed through a web browser.

=== General networking ===
- I2PTunnel is an application embedded into I2P that allows arbitrary TCP/IP applications to communicate over I2P by setting up "tunnels" which can be accessed by connecting to pre-determined ports on localhost.
- SAM (Simple Anonymous Messaging) is a protocol which allows a client application written in any programming language to communicate over I2P, by using a socket-based interface to the I2P router.
- BOB (Basic Open Bridge) is a less complex app to router protocol similar to "SAM"
- Orchid Outproxy Tor plugin
- As of version 2.6.0, released in July 2024, I2P no longer allows I2P access over Tor connections.

=== Chat ===
- Any IRC client made for the Internet Relay Chat can work, once connected to the I2P IRC server (on localhost). I2P have the option to create tunnels that are specific for this usage, where certain commands that could de-anonymize the user are filtered out.
- Some XMPP clients like Gajim, Pidgin or a modified Conversations client can work with I2P XMPP servers using Prosody that are using the mod_darknet module

=== File sharing ===
- Several programs provide BitTorrent functionality for use within the I2P network. Users cannot connect to non-I2P torrents or peers from within I2P, nor can they connect to I2P torrents or peers from outside I2P. I2PSnark, included in the I2P install package, is a port of the BitTorrent client named Snark. Vuze, formerly known as Azureus, is a BitTorrent client that includes a plugin for I2P, allowing anonymous swarming through this network. This plugin is still in an early stage of development, however it is already fairly stable. I2P-BT is a BitTorrent client for I2P that allows anonymous swarming for file sharing. This client is a modified version of the original BitTorrent 3.4.2 program which runs on MS Windows and most dialects of Unix in a GUI and command-line environment. It was developed by the individual known as 'duck' on I2P in cooperation with 'smeghead'. It is no longer being actively developed; however, there is a small effort to upgrade the I2P-BT client up to par with the BitTorrent 4.0 release. I2PRufus is an I2P port of the Rufus BitTorrent client. Robert (P2P Software) is the most actively maintained I2PRufus fork. XD is a standalone BitTorrent client written in Go. BiglyBT is a bittorrent client based on Vuze which also allows the use of i2p for downloading/seeding. Additionally, there exists a torrent index named Postman, ran by the individual with the same name, its rules says that it does not allow illegal content, but warez and piracy is accepted.
- Two Kad network clients exist for the I2P network, iMule and Nachtblitz. iMule (invisible Mule) is a port of eMule for I2P network. iMule has not been developed since 2013. iMule is made for anonymous file sharing. In contrast to other eDonkey clients, iMule only uses the Kademlia for proceeding to connect through I2P network, so no servers are needed. Nachtblitz is a custom client built on the .NET Framework. The latest version is 1.4.27, released on March 23, 2016. Nachtblitz includes a time lock to disable the software one year after its release date.
- I2Phex is a port of the popular Gnutella client Phex to I2P. It is stable and fairly functional.
- Tahoe-LAFS has been ported to I2P. This allows for files to be anonymously stored in Tahoe-LAFS grids.
- MuWire is a file-sharing program inspired by the LimeWire Gnutella client that works atop the I2P network.

==== Bridging to clearnet ====
Currently, Vuze and BiglyBT are the torrent clients that make clearnet (connections not through I2P) torrents available on I2P and vice versa. Depending on the client settings, torrents from the internet can be made available on I2P (via announcements to I2P's DHT network) and torrents from I2P can be made available to the internet. For this reason, torrents previously published only on I2P can be made available to the entire Internet, and users of I2P can often download popular content from the Internet while maintaining the anonymity of I2P. As of August 2022, the default outproxy is exit.stormycloud.i2p which is run by StormyCloud Inc.

=== Email ===
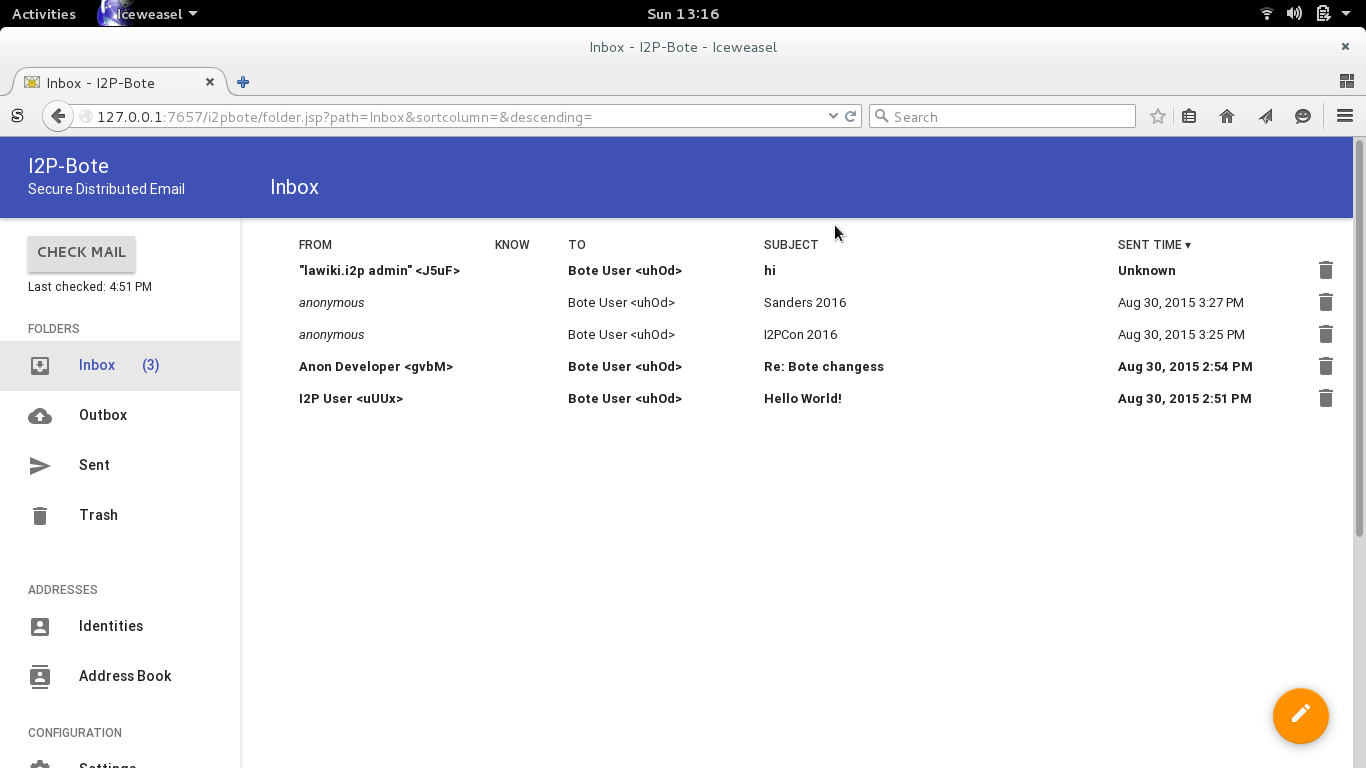
A screenshot of the inbox of I2P-Bote.

- I2P-Bote is a free, fully decentralized and distributed anonymous email system with a strong focus on security. It supports multiple identities and does not expose email metadata. As of 2015, it is still considered beta software. I2P-Bote is accessible via the I2P web console interface or using standard email protocols (i.e., IMAP/SMTP). All bote-mails are transparently end-to-end encrypted and signed by the sender's private key, thus removing the need for PGP or other email encryption software. I2P-Bote offers additional anonymity by allowing for the use of mail relays with variable length delays. Since it is decentralized, there is no centralized email server that could correlate different email identities as communicating with each other (i.e. profiling). Even the nodes relaying the mails do not know the sender, and apart from sender and receiver, only the end of the high-latency mail route and the storing nodes will know to whom (which I2P-Bote address – the user's IP address is still hidden by I2P) the mail is destined. The original sender could have gone offline long before the email becomes available to the recipient. No account registration is necessary, all you have to do in order to use it is create a new identity. I2P-Bote can be installed as an I2P plugin .
- I2P also has a free pseudonymous e-mail service run by an individual called Postman. Susimail is a web-based email client intended primarily for use with Postman's mail servers, and is designed with security and anonymity in mind. Susimail was created to address privacy concerns in using these servers directly using traditional email clients, such as leaking the user's hostname while communicating with the SMTP server. It is currently included in the default I2P distribution, and can be accessed through the I2P router console web interface. Mail.i2p can contact both I2P email users and public internet email users.
- Bitmessage.ch can be used over I2P

=== Instant messaging ===
- I2P-Messenger is a simple Qt-based, serverless, end-to-end-encrypted instant messenger for I2P. No servers can log the user's conversations. No ISP can log with whom the user chats, when, or for how long. As it is serverless, it can make use of I2P's end-to-end encryption, preventing any node between two parties from having access to the plain text. I2P-Messenger can be used for fully anonymous instant communication with persons the user doesn't even know, or, alternatively, to communicate securely and untraceably with friends, family members, or colleagues. In addition to messaging, file transfer is also supported.
- I2P-Talk is another simple instant messenger incompatible with I2P-Messenger, but having the same security properties

=== Publishing ===
- Syndie is a content distribution application, suitable for blogs, newsgroups, forums and small media attachments. Syndie is designed for network resilience. It supports connections to I2P, the Tor network (Syndie does not support Socks proxies, workaround needed for Tor access), Freenet and the regular internet. Server connections are intermittent, and support higher-latency communications. Connections can be made to any number of known servers. Content is spread efficiently using a Gossip protocol.
- Aktie is an anonymous file sharing and distributed web of trust forums system. Aktie can connect to I2P with its internal router or use an external router. To fight spam, "hash payments" (proof of CPU work) is computed for every published item.

=== Routers ===
- i2pd is a light-weight I2P router written in C++, stripping the excessive applications such as e-mail, torrents, and others that can be regarded as bloat. The I2PSnark standalone BitTorrent client by I2P+ Team can still be used with it.

=== The Privacy Solutions project ===
The Privacy Solutions project, a new organization that develops and maintains I2P software, launched several new development efforts designed to enhance the privacy, security, and anonymity for users, based on I2P protocols and technology.

These efforts include:

- The Abscond browser bundle.
- i2pd, an alternate implementation of I2P, written in C++ (rather than Java).
- The "BigBrother" I2P network monitoring project.

The code repository and download sections for the i2pd and Abscond project is available for the public to review and download. Effective January, 2015 i2pd is operating under PurpleI2P.

=== Android ===
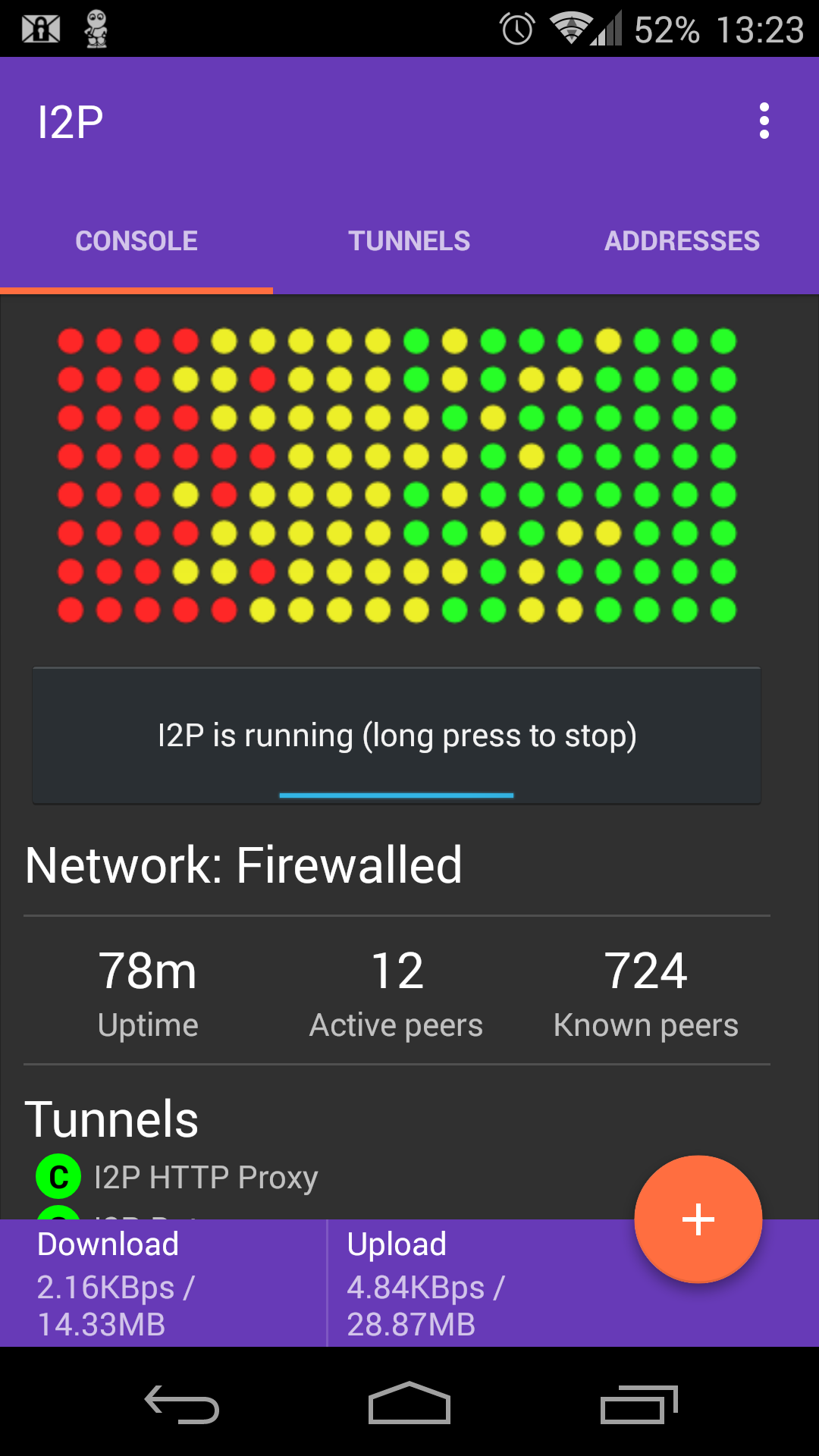
I2P running on Android.

- Release builds of an I2P Router application for Android can be found on the Google Play store under The Privacy Solutions Project's Google Play account or on an F-Droid repository hosted by the developers.
- Nightweb is an Android application that utilizes I2P and Bittorrent to share blog posts, photos, and other similar content. It can also be run as a desktop application. It is no longer in development.

=== Cryptocurrency ===
Some cryptocurrencies that support I2P are listed below.

- Bitcoin
- Monero
- Verge

== Terminology ==
I2P's mascot, itoopie, who is looking through a magnifying glass.

Eepsite
Eepsites are websites that are hosted anonymously within the I2P network. Eepsite names end in .i2p, such as ugha.i2p or forum.i2p. EepProxy can locate these sites through the cryptographic identifier keys stored in the hosts.txt file found within the I2P program directory. Typically, I2P is required to access these eepsites.
.i2p
'I2p' is a pseudo-top-level domain which is only valid within the I2P overlay network scope. .i2p names are resolved by browsers by submitting requests to EepProxy which will resolve names to an I2P peer key and will handle data transfers over the I2P network while remaining transparent to the browser.
EepProxy
The EepProxy program handles all communication between the browser and any eepsite. It functions as a proxy server that can be used by any web browser.
Peers, I2P nodes
Other machines using I2P that are connected to user's machine within the network. Each machine within the network shares the routing and forwarding of encrypted packets.
Tunnels
Every ten minutes, a connection is established between the user's machine and another peer. Data to and from the user, along with the data for other peers (routed through the user's machine), pass through these tunnels and are forwarded to their final destination (may include more jumps).
netDb
The distributed hash table (DHT) database based on the Kademlia algorithm that holds information on I2P nodes and I2P eepsites. This database is split up among routers known as "floodfill routers". When a user wants to know how to contact an eepsite, or where more peers are, they query the database.

== Vulnerabilities ==
Denial of service attacks are possible against websites hosted on the network, though a site operator may secure their site against certain versions of this type of attack to some extent.

A zero-day vulnerability was discovered for I2P in 2014, theoretically allowing the de-anonymization of any user visiting a malicious site. This included users of the operating system Tails. This vulnerability was later patched.

A 2017 study examining how forensic investigators might exploit vulnerabilities in I2P software to gather useful evidence indicated that a seized machine which had been running I2P router software may hold unencrypted local data that could be useful to law enforcement. Records of which websites a user of a later-seized machine was interested in may also be inferred. The study identified a "trusted" I2P domain registrar ("NO.i2p") which appeared to have been abandoned by its administrator, and which the study identified as a potential target for law enforcement takeover. It alternatively suggested waiting for NO.i2p's server to fail, only to social engineer the I2P community into moving to a phony replacement. Another suggestion the study proposed was to register a mirror version of a target website under an identical domain.

While I2P is used in many countries, a 2019 study found evidence of it being censored in several regions through DNS tampering (e.g., China), SNI-based blocking, and blockpage injection (e.g., Oman, Qatar, and Kuwait).

== I2PCon ==
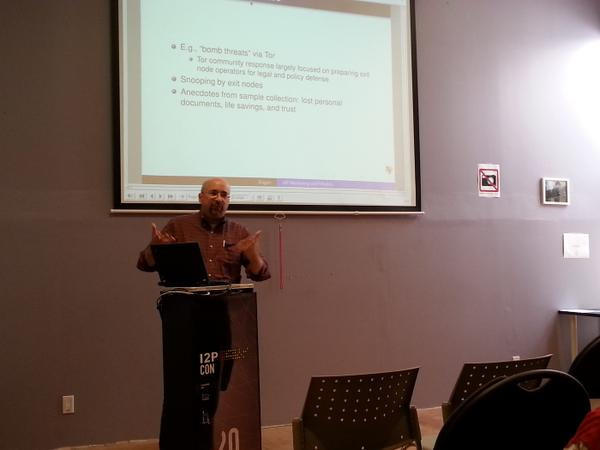
David Dagon presenting at the first I2Pcon.

From August 15, 2015 to August 16, 2015 an I2P convention was held in Toronto, Ontario. The conference was hosted by a local hackerspace, Hacklab. The conference featured presentations from I2P developers and security researchers.

== See also ==
- Crypto-anarchy
- Deep web
- Darknet
- Garlic routing
- Key-based routing
- Public-key cryptography
- Rendezvous protocol
- Secure communication
- Threat model

=== Software ===
- Hyphanet
- Mix network
- RetroShare
- Tor
- Tribler
- ZeroNet
