= Garlic routing =

Internet protocol

Garlic routing is a variant of onion routing that encrypts multiple messages together to make it more difficult for attackers to perform traffic analysis while also increasing the speed of data transfer.

Michael J. Freedman defined garlic routing as an extension of onion routing, in which multiple messages are bundled together. He called each message a "bulb", whereas I2P calls them "garlic cloves." All messages, each with their own delivery instructions, are exposed at the endpoint. This enables efficient bundling of an onion routing reply block with the original message.

Garlic routing is one of the key factors that distinguishes I2P from Tor and other privacy-focused or encryption networks. The name alludes to the garlic plant, whose multi-layered structure this protocol resembles. "Garlic routing" was coined by Michael J. Freedman in Roger Dingledine's Free Haven Master's thesis Section 8.1.1 (June 2000), as derived from Onion Routing. However, the garlic routing implementation in I2P differs from the design proposed by Freedman. The key distinction is that garlic routing used unidirectional tunnels, while mainstream alternatives like Tor and Mixmaster use bidirectional tunnels.

== Garlic Cast: Lightweight and Decentralized Content Sharing ==
One potential implementation of the garlic routing protocol is shown in the paper Garlic Cast: Lightweight and Decentralized Anonymous Content Sharing. The idea is to provide a resilient and low latency anonymous content sharing network based on garlic routing. The distinguishing benefit that makes the system different from traditional Tor networks is that it is designed around secure, fast communication. This is achieved by allowing the Garlic Cast system to use random walks to find proxies in the overlay network, then applying a security-enhanced Information Dispersal Algorithm to deliver content efficiently and securely. Lastly, the Garlic Cast network is designed to resist a wide range of attacks while maintaining a high level of anonymity.

== List of P2P applications that use garlic routing ==
- I2P, an anonymizing overlay network that allows applications to run on top of it (open-source, written in Java)
- Perfect Dark, a P2P client which relies on a mixnet and distributed datastore to provide anonymity (freeware, written for Windows)

== See also ==
- Anonymous remailer
- Key-based routing
- Mix network
- Mixmaster anonymous remailer
- Public-key cryptography
