= Twister (software) =

Decentralized microblogging software

- Original author: Miguel Freitas
- Developers: Open-source on Github, Miguel Freitas, Lucas Leal
- Release: December 30, 2013; 12 years ago
- Written in: C++
- Operating system: FreeBSD, Linux, Mac OS X, Microsoft Windows, and Android
- Size: 1 MB
- Available in: English, Russian
- Type: Social network service, microblogging
- License: MIT and BSD licenses
- Website: twister.net.co
- Repository: github.com/miguelfreitas/twister-core

Twister is a decentralized and experimental peer-to-peer microblogging program which uses end-to-end encryption to safeguard communications. Based on BitTorrent and Bitcoin-like protocols, it has been likened to a distributed version of Twitter.

In 2020, original author Miguel Freitas said that he would no longer be leading Twister development for the "foreseeable future". The Twister network has continued functioning, however, and Freitas suggested that others might want to fork the project. It was also announced that the website might go offline, since its hosting was due to expire. The Twister core had been at version 0.9.40 since 2018. Its source code remains available on GitHub.

== Overview ==
Twister is a Twitter-like microblogging platform that utilizes the same blockchain technology as Bitcoin and the file-exchange method of BitTorrent, both based on P2P technology.

Twister was alpha-phase experimental software in 2014, implemented as a distributed file sharing system. User registration and authentication are provided by a Bitcoin-like network, so it does not depend on a central authority. Distribution of posts uses a Kademlia distributed hash table (DHT) network and BitTorrent-like swarms, both provided by libtorrent.

Miguel Freitas, aiming to build a censor-resistant public posting platform, began development of Twister in July 2013 to address free-speech and privacy concerns. Building on Bitcoin and Bittorrent, he built the core structure in October 2013. Lucas Leal was hired to create HTML and CSS for the user interface, with Freitas writing the required JavaScript code. Twenty-five hundred user accounts were registered in the platform's first six days of operation.

Twister cannot be incapacitated (since there is no central point to attack), and uses end-to-end encryption. As a consequence of decentralization, a user will be unable to regain access to their "account" if they lose access to their secret key.

== History ==
Brazilian computer engineer and programmer Miguel Freitas started developing the social network after learning about the massive surveillance programs of the US's National Security Agency (NSA) from NSA whistleblower Edward Snowden. He began to worry about the accessibility of a large quantity of information controlled by a single entity under American jurisdiction.

According to Freitas, Twitter is the social network that has been the most prominent in promoting democracy and the organisation of protests. He built Twister based on privacy-preserving technology due to the risks involved in providing personal information on social networks in light of mass surveillance conducted by the NSA.

Freitas and his developer, Leal, built the application's alpha version for Android, Linux and OS X. First-party versions for Windows and iOS are not planned.

== Technology ==
Twister is a distributed system that uses peer-to-peer architecture. Unlike other decentralised networks, it does not require the user to use their own server or trust a third-party server to use it. Distribution is achieved through the Bitcoin protocol, on a different network than that used by the cryptocurrency. The protocol handles the registration of users, and the Twister network verifies the users' names and that a message posted by a user originated from that user. Messages are transmitted through the BitTorrent protocol. Because it is a peer-to-peer system, there is no central server from which information may be collected. Twister was developed in Linux, and was ported to Android and OS X.

== Functionality ==
The first Twister prototype intended to reproduce the basic characteristics of microblogging platforms, including:

- Searching, following and unfollowing users
- Limiting the length of text-based messages to 140 characters
- Broadcasting and answering messages
- Browsing through mentions, hashtags and private messages

Private messages require the addressee to follow the speaker.

== Security ==
Twister has no central node to mediate messages. It uses 256-bit ECC encryption with the same secp256k1 parameters as Bitcoin, reportedly providing similar security to a 3072-bit RSA key. The direct message application is based on code published by Ladar Levison of Lavabit. Peers' IP addresses are not recorded in the application, but network interception can identify data flow between devices.

== See also ==
- ActivityPub – Decentralized social networking protocol
- Nostr – Decentralized social networking protocol
