= Peer-to-peer SIP =

Distributed VoIP implementation

Peer-to-peer SIP (P2P-SIP) is an implementation of a distributed voice over Internet Protocol (VoIP) or instant messaging communications application using a peer-to-peer (P2P) architecture in which session control between communication end points is facilitated with the Session Initiation Protocol (SIP).

== SIP in a P2P architecture ==
In a pure peer-to-peer application architecture no central servers are required, whereas traditional SIP telephony networks have relied on using centrally deployed and managed SIP servers, in analogy to the centralized switching architecture of the public switched telephone network (PSTN). P2P application design can improve scalability and survivability in the event of central network outages.

The Session Initiation Protocol is in principle a client-server protocol, however it has been described in analogy to the P2P relationship, called a dialog, which is defined by a unique combination of SIP protocol parameters (To-tag, From-tag, Call-ID). Both endpoints of a communication session implement a user-agent server and a user-agent client, which enables any two user agents to communicate directly with one another without the mediation of another a central switching system. SIP also provides facilities of registering (REGISTER request) the network location of a user agent with other SIP elements and subscription (SUBSCRIBE request) and notification (NOTIFY request) features for event tracking between user agents.

Based on these inherent SIP features it is possible to construct a peer-to-peer network of SIP nodes.

In another approach, SIP over P2P, the SIP location service is replaced by conventional P2P overlay networking approach, such as the OverSim framework. In this model, the overlay network is used for service or node discovery and rendezvous. The search key in such a mechanism is the Uniform Resource Identifier (URI) of a user agent. This URI requires resolution to a particular device or Uniform Resource Locator (URL) that must be performed in real time. P2P-SIP systems may employ structured peer-to-peer approaches, as well as unstructured peer-to-peer architectures.

== Standards ==
The Internet Engineering Task Force (IETF) is conducting a working group (P2PSIP) that develops standards-track specifications for P2P-SIP. This effort is based on using the REsource LOcation And Discovery (RELOAD) Base Protocol a peer-to-peer (P2P) signaling protocol for use on the Internet. The P2P signaling protocol provides the network nodes that form an overlay network with abstract storage, messaging, and security services.
