= P2P Universal Computing Consortium =

- Abbreviation: PUCC
- Formation: December 2004
- Type: Standards Organization
- Purpose: promoting research and development of an open P2P/Overlay network service platform, and conducts the standardization efforts.
- Headquarters: Tokyo
- Region served: Worldwide
- PUCC Board Chair: Nobuo Saito
- Website: www.pucc.jp

P2P Universal Computing Consortium (PUCC) is promoting research and development of an open P2P/Overlay network service platform that connects multi-types of devices users use, and conducts the standardization efforts. PUCC is a cross-industry consortium for open P2P/Overlay network standards. PUCC operations are supported by a combination of membership dues and public grants.

== Objectives ==
1. Realize a seamless peer-to-peer communication platform that enables the creations of high level ubiquitous service between multi type networks and devices
2. Create neutral protocols through cross-industry cooperation by sharing comm-interoperable on goals and visions
3. Conduct research and development to create compelling technologies that support our everyday lives.

== Working Groups ==
- Architecture & Protocols (ap-wg)
- Printing (prt-wg)
- Streaming (st-wg)
- Security (sec-wg)
- Home Appliance Control (ha-wg)
- Sensor Device Control WG (sdc-wg)
- Healthcare Device WG (hc-wg) To be appeared soon
- Device IOP Task Force (dev-tf)

== History ==
- In 2004, PUCC (P2P Universal Computing Consortium) was founded in Tokyo . The founding members were NTT DoCoMO, Ericsson, Kyoto University, and Keio University.
- April 2005: The Working Groups were started. started standardization work on an open overlay network in the area of several applications, as well as core communication protocols and metadata.
- July 2006: First government supported R&D was started. R&D work on harmonization of mobile network, home network, imaging devices was conducted using government funds.
- March 2007: First PUCC specifications were published.
- June 2007: PUCC joined the Healthy Living project, as a part of the Information Grand Voyage Project, supported by METI (Ministry of Economy, Trade and Industry).
- November 2008: PUCC continuously supports the Information Grad Voyage Project. PUCC open overlay network is used as a platform to gather information and NON-IP networks and devices such as sensor networks, USB, Bluetooth.

== PUCC chairs ==
- Nobuo Saito (2004)
