= Key-based routing =

Technique used in computer networking

Key-based routing (KBR) is a lookup method used in conjunction with distributed hash tables (DHTs) and certain other overlay networks. While DHTs provide a method to find a host responsible for a certain piece of data, KBR provides a method to find the closest host for that data, according to some defined metric. This may not necessarily be defined as physical distance, but rather the number of network hops.

== Key-based routing networks ==
- Freenet
- GNUnet
- Kademlia
- Onion routing
- Garlic routing

== See also ==
- Public-key cryptography
- Distributed Hash Table - Overlay Network
- Anonymous P2P
