= Sylvia Ratnasamy =

Belgian-Indian scientist

- Education: UC Berkeley, University of Pune
- Known for: Distributed hash tables, software routing
- Awards: Grace Murray Hopper Award Sloan Fellowship
- Scientific career
- Fields: Computer Science
- Workplaces: UC Berkeley, Intel Labs, International Computer Science Institute, Nefeli Networks
- Thesis: A Scalable Content-Addressable Network (2002)
- Doctoral advisor: Scott Shenker; Ion Stoica

Sylvia Ratnasamy (born c. 1976) is a Belgian-Indian computer scientist. She is best known as one of the inventors of the distributed hash table (DHT). Her doctoral dissertation proposed the content-addressable networks, one of the original DHTs, and she received the ACM Grace Murray Hopper Award in 2014 for this work. She is a professor at the University of California, Berkeley.

== Life and career ==
Ratnasamy received her Bachelor of Engineering from the University of Pune in 1997. She began doctoral work at UC Berkeley advised by Scott Shenker during which time she worked at the International Computer Science Institute in Berkeley, CA. She graduated from UC Berkeley with her doctoral degree in 2002.

For her doctoral thesis, she designed and implemented what would eventually become known as one of the four original Distributed Hash Tables, the Content addressable network (CAN).

Ratnasamy was a lead researcher at Intel Labs until 2011, when she began as an assistant professor at UC Berkeley. In recent years, Ratnasamy has focused her research on programmable networks including the RouteBricks software router and pioneering work in Network Functions Virtualization (NFV). In 2016, she co-founded Nefeli Networks to commercialize NFV technologies.

== Awards ==
- ACM Fellow (2025)
- ACM SIGCOMM Rising Star Award (2017)
- Grace Murray Hopper Award (2014)
- Sloan Fellowship (2012)
- ACM SIGCOMM Test-of-Time Award (2011)
