= Legal issues with BitTorrent =

Copyright issues relating to file sharing

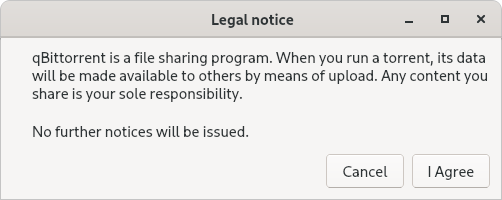
Legal notice provided upon an initial startup of the QBittorrent client.

The use of the BitTorrent protocol for the unauthorized sharing of copyrighted content generated a variety of novel legal issues. While the technology and related platforms are legal in many jurisdictions, law enforcement and prosecutorial agencies are attempting to address this avenue of copyright infringement. Notably, the use of BitTorrent in connection with copyrighted material may make the issuers of the BitTorrent file, link or metadata liable as an infringing party under some copyright laws. Similarly, the use of BitTorrent to procure illegal materials could potentially create liability for end users as an accomplice.

BitTorrent files can be seen conceptually as a hyperlink. However, it can also be a very specific instruction for how to obtain content on the internet. BitTorrent may transmit or include illegal or copyrighted content. Court decisions in various jurisdictions have deemed some BitTorrent files illegal.

Complicating the legal analysis are jurisdictional issues that are common when sovereign states attempt to regulate any activity. BitTorrent files and links can be accessed in different geographic locations and legal jurisdictions. Thus, it is possible to host a BitTorrent file in geographic jurisdictions where it is legal and others where it is illegal. A single link, file or data or download action may be actionable in some places, but not in others. This analysis applies to other sharing technologies and platforms.

== Jurisdictional variations ==
Legal regimes vary from country to country. BitTorrent metafiles do not store copyrighted data and are ordinarily unobjectionable. Some accused parties argued that BitTorrent trackers are legal even if sharing the copyrighted data in question was a copyright violation. Despite these arguments, there has been tremendous legal pressure, usually on behalf of the MPAA, RIAA and similar organizations around the world, to shut down BitTorrent trackers.

=== Finland: Finreactor ===
In December 2004, Finnish police raided Finreactor, a major BitTorrent site. Seven system administrators and four others were ordered to pay hundreds of thousands of euros in damages. The defendants appealed the case all the way to the Supreme Court of Finland, but failed to overturn the verdict. Two other defendants were acquitted because they were underage at the time, but were held liable for legal fees and compensation for illegal distribution ranging up to 60,000 euros. The court set their fine at 10% of the retail price of products distributed.

=== Hong Kong: individual actions ===
On 24 October 2005, BitTorrent user Chan Nai-ming (陳乃明), using the handle 古惑天皇 (The Master of Cunning, although the magistrate referred to him as Big Crook) was convicted of violating copyright by uploading Daredevil, Red Planet and Miss Congeniality to a newsgroup (Chapter 528 of Hong Kong law). The magistrate remarked that Chan's act significantly damaged the interest of copyright holders. He was released on bail for HK$5,000, awaiting a sentencing hearing, though the magistrate himself admitted the difficulty of determining how he should be sentenced due to the lack of precedent. On 7 November 2005 he was sentenced to jail for three months, but was immediately granted bail pending an appeal. The appeal was dismissed by the Court of First Instance on 12 December 2006 and Chan was immediately jailed. On 3 January 2007, he was released pending appeal to the Court of Final Appeal on 9 May 2007.

In 2008 and 2009, an unidentified woman and man were arrested for illegally uploading files with BitTorrent in September 2008 and April 2009, respectively.

=== Singapore: Odex actions against users ===
Anime distributor Odex actively took down and sent legal threats against individual BitTorrent users in Singapore beginning in 2007. These Internet users allegedly downloaded fansubbed anime via BitTorrent. Court orders required Internet service providers (ISPs) to reveal subscribers' personal information. This led to cease-and-desist letters from Odex to users that led to out-of-court settlements for at least S$3,000 (US$2,000) per person. One person who received such a letter was 9 years old. These actions were considered controversial by the local anime community and attracted criticism, as they were seen by fans as heavy-handed.

=== Slovenia: Suprnova ===
In December 2004, Suprnova.org, a popular early BitTorrent site, closed purportedly due to the pressure felt by Andre Preston, aka Sloncek, the site's founder and administrator. In December 2005, Sloncek revealed that the Suprnova computer servers had been confiscated by Slovenian authorities.

=== Sweden: Pirate Bay ===
The Pirate Bay torrent website, formed by a Swedish anti-copyright group, is notorious for the "legal threats" section of its website in which letters and replies on the subject of alleged copyright infringements are publicly displayed. On 31 May 2006, their servers in Sweden were raided by Swedish police on allegations by the MPAA of copyright infringement. The site was back online in less than 72 hours, and returned to Sweden, accompanied by public and media backlash against the government's actions. Steal This Film, was made to cover these incidents. On 17 April 2009, as a result of the trial following the raid, the site's four co-founders were sentenced to one year of jail time each and to collectively pay 30 million SEK in damages. All the defendants appealed the decision, although two later served their sentences. In 2012, to minimize legal exposure and save computer resources, The Pirate Bay entirely switched to providing plaintext magnet links instead of traditional torrent files. As the most popular and well-known facilitator of copyright infringement, The Pirate Bay continues to shift between different hosting facilities and domain registrars in the face of legal prosecution and shutdown threats. Telenor was recently forced to ban the DNS of TPB (although other cloud based clones still are available).

=== Greece: P2planet ===
In May 2025, a Greek national was found guilty of his involvement in the operation of torrent site p2planet.net receiving a five year sentence and resulting in the convicted person being taken immediately to prison.

=== United States: 2003–present ===
Soon after the closure of Suprnova, civil and criminal legal actions in the United States began to increase.

==== MPAA cease and desist messages ====
In 2003, the Motion Picture Association of America began to send cease and desist messages to BitTorrent sites, leading to the shutdown of Torrentse and Sharelive in July 2003.

==== LokiTorrent ====
In 2005, Edward Webber (known as "lowkee"), webmaster of LokiTorrent, was ordered by a U.S. court to pay a fine and supply the MPAA with server logs (including the IP addresses of visitors). Webber began a fundraising campaign to pay legal fees for actions brought by the MPAA. Webber raised approximately US$45,000 through a PayPal-based donation system. Following the agreement, the MPAA changed the LokiTorrent website to display a message intended to discourage filesharers from downloading illegal content.

==== EliteTorrents ====
On 25 May 2005, the popular BitTorrent website EliteTorrents.org was shut down by the United States Federal Bureau of Investigation and Immigration and Customs Enforcement. Ten search warrants relating to members of the website were executed.

Six site administrators pleaded guilty to conspiracy to commit criminal copyright infringement and criminal copyright infringement of a pre-commercial release work. Punishments included jail time, house arrest and fines. Jail sentences were issued to some defendants violations of criminal law, the Family Entertainment and Copyright Act.

==== Newnova ====
In June 2006, the popular website Newnova.org, a replicate of Suprnova, was closed.

==== TorrentSpy ====
On 29 May 2007, a U.S. federal judge ordered TorrentSpy to begin monitoring its users' activities and to submit logs to MPAA. TorrentSpy ultimately removed access for US visitors rather than operate in an "uncertain legal environment." In the face of destruction of evidence charges and a $111 million legal judgement, TorrentSpy voluntarily shut down and filed for bankruptcy in 2008, although appeals continued through 2009.

==== isoHunt ====
On 21 December 2009 a federal district court found the founder of isoHunt guilty of inducing copyright infringement. The ruling was upheld on appeal in Columbia Pictures Industries, Inc. v. Fung in March 2013 and the site finally shut down in October 2013.

== Copyright holder actions ==
Copyright owners have undertaken a variety of tactics and strategies to try to curtail BitTorrent transmittal of their intellectual property. In 2005 HBO began "poisoning" torrents of its show Rome, by providing bad chunks of data to clients. In 2007 HBO sent cease and desist letters to the ISPs of BitTorrent users. Many users reported receiving letters from their ISP's that threatened to cut off their internet service if the alleged infringement continued. HBO, unlike the RIAA, has not been reported to have filed suit over file sharing as of April 2007.

Beginning in early 2010, the US Copyright Group, acting on behalf of several independent movie makers, has obtained the IP addresses of BitTorrent users illegally downloading specific movies. The group then sued these users, in order to obtain subpoenas forcing ISPs to reveal the users' true identities. The group then sent out settlement offers in the $1,000–$3,000 range. About 16,200 lawsuits were filed between March and September 2010.

In 2011, United States courts began determining the legality of suits brought against hundreds or thousands of BitTorrent users. Nearly simultaneously, a suit against 5,000 IP addresses was dismissed. A smaller suit, Pacific Century International, Ltd. v. Does against 100 IPs, has also been dismissed.

In October 2011, John Wiley and Sons brought suit against 27 New York "John Does" for illegally copying books from the For Dummies series. According to TorrentFreak, Wiley is thus "the first book publisher to take this kind of action".

== Settlements ==
On 23 November 2005, the Motion Picture Association of America and Bram Cohen, the CEO of BitTorrent Inc., signed a deal to remove links to illegal content on the official BitTorrent website.

Other notable search engines also voluntarily self-censored licensed content from their results, or became "content distribution"-only search engines. Mininova, announced that it would only allow freely licensed content (especially free content distributed by its author under a Creative Commons license) to be indexed after November 2009, resulting in the immediate removal of a majority of Mininova's search.

== Infringement's sales impact ==
Some commentators have suggested that copyright violation through BitTorrent need not mean a loss of sales.

The actual story is probably a bit more nuanced. There’s plenty to suggest, for instance, that HBO doesn’t necessarily lose business when someone pirates "Game of Thrones" -- in all likelihood, that person would never subscribe to the network, anyway.

— Caitlin Dewey, The Washington Post

In addition, the Game of Thrones director, HBO programming president and Time Warner CEO Jeff Bewkes spoke about the positive effects of file sharing.

"If you go around the world, I think you're right, that 'Game of Thrones' is the most pirated show in the world," he said. "Now that's better than an Emmy."

— Jeff Bewkes

Bewkes further commented that he did not consider the unauthorized distribution to result in the loss of HBO subscriptions, rather: "Our experience is, it all leads to more penetration, more paying subs and more health for HBO." The show is the most infringed TV show, and "the show's first season was the best-selling TV DVD of 2012.

== Patent infringement ==
In June 2011, Tranz-Send Broadcasting Network filed a U.S. District Court lawsuit against BitTorrent Inc. for infringing a patent applied for in April 1999.

== See also ==
- BitTorrent
- File sharing
- Legal aspects of file sharing
- Torrent poisoning
- Virtual private network
- Copyleft
- Opposition to copyright
- Kopimi
