= TorrentFreak =

Blog on file sharing, copyright infringement, and digital rights

- Screenshot of the site
- Website type: Blog
- Available in: English
- Owner: Lennart Renkema PhD
- Creators: Ernesto van der Sar; Andy Maxwell; Rickard Falkvinge; Ben Jones (modified WordPress)
- Editor: Ernesto van der Sar
- Revenue: Advertisements
- Website: torrentfreak.com
- Launched: 12 November 2005; 21 years ago
- Content license: CC BY-NC 3.0 (text only)

TorrentFreak (TF) is a blog dedicated to reporting the latest news and trends on the BitTorrent protocol and file sharing, as well as on copyright infringement and digital rights.

The website was started in November 2005 by a Dutchman using the pseudonym "Ernesto van der Sar". He was joined by Andy "Enigmax" Maxwell and Ben Jones in 2007. Regular contributors include Rickard Falkvinge, founder of the Pirate Party. The online publication eCommerceTimes, in 2009, described "Ernesto" as the pseudonym of Lennart Renkema, owner of TorrentFreak. TorrentFreak's text is free content under a Creative Commons Attribution-NonCommercial version 3.0 license.

TorrentFreak's lead researcher and community manager was the Pirate Party activist Andrew Norton, from 2007 to 2022.

TorrentFreak is incorporated in the Netherlands, with an office in Groningen and a mailing address in Manchester, United Kingdom.

== Specialist areas ==
According to Canadian law scholar Michael Geist, TorrentFreak "is widely used as a source of original reporting on digital issues".

Frequent areas of reporting include:

- The City of London's Police Intellectual Property Crime Unit
- United States Trade Representative and Notorious Markets reports
- Anti-piracy web blocking
- Torrent tracker news
- VPN and seedbox reviews
- File sharing website news
- Copyright law news
- Warez scene news

As well as other news affecting copyright, privacy, file sharing and adjacent topics.

=== Editorial stance ===
In a 2021 article, Andy Maxwell outlined TorrentFreak's editorial stance. He wrote: "As a publication entirely dedicated to reporting on copyright, piracy, torrent, and streaming sites (plus all things closely related), here at TorrentFreak we aim to tell all 'sides' of the story. We do not shy away from reports that show that piracy hurts sales and we have no problem publishing research projects that show completely the opposite. It's called balanced reporting and it hurts absolutely no one."

== History ==
On 17 August 2007, TorrentFreak reported that Comcast had begun throttling its upload bandwidth, specifically against BitTorrent users. This made seeding, which is an essential part of the BitTorrent protocol, effectively impossible. It was later determined that Comcast was using Sandvine products, which implement network traffic shaping and policing, and include support for both blocking new and forcefully terminating established network connections. Comcast denied these claims whenever asked to comment. A guide for customer service representatives when asked about Comcast's BitTorrent throttling was leaked to The Consumerist on 26 October 2007.

Between October 2008 and March 2011, TorrentFreak ran a short-lived video news service titled torrentfreak.tv, directed by Andrej Preston, founder of the torrent site Suprnova, and made available for streaming and download on Mininova.

On 21 August 2013, Comcast threatened TorrentFreak with legal action for reproducing publicly available court documents. The document linked a Comcast subscriber with the Prenda Law firm in a copyright infringement lawsuit.

In August 2013, Sky Broadband blocked the site for UK customers after torrent site EZTV pointed its DNS servers to TorrentFreak's IP address. In July 2014, the site was also blocked by the Sky Broadband Shield parental filter system.

=== 2020s ===
During the 2020s, TorrentFreak continued to focus on copyright, digital rights, and anti-piracy developments, covering topics such as court-ordered website blocking, IPTV enforcement, domain seizures, and new enforcement strategies by rights holders.

In 2022, TorrentFreak highlighted the takedown of the e-book library Z-Library and the increasing global scope of ISP blocking orders in its annual “Most-Read News Articles of 2022”.

In 2024, the site reported on film companies’ attempts to obtain a Reddit user’s torrenting history, illustrating the widening scope of discovery requests in U.S. piracy litigation. It also covered the largest IPTV piracy trial in U.S. history, involving the Jetflicks and iStreamitAll services.

In 2025, TorrentFreak reported on a $15 million judgment obtained by Netflix, Amazon, and several Hollywood studios against the operator of the pirate IPTV service Outer Limits.

Throughout its history, TorrentFreak has documented copyright litigation, ISP enforcement policies, and digital rights cases, maintaining a reputation as a long-running independent publication focused on the intersection of technology and copyright law.
