= Comparison of BitTorrent tracker software =

The following is a list of notable software for running a BitTorrent tracker.

Tracker	Programming Language	License	IPv4	IPv6	Operating System Support	Description
MLDonkey	OCaml	GPL-2.0-or-later	Yes		Windows, OS X, Unix-like, Morph OS	Has a built-in tracker and announcement service
MonoTorrent	C#	MIT	Yes		Windows, Mac OS, Unix-like	Uses Mono or .NET Core for cross-platform support (.NET)
Opentracker	C	Beerware	Yes	Yes	Unix-like (source code only)	Uses libowfat, performs well even on embedded hardware. Only requirement is a POSIX compliant OS. Supports only a compact peer list.
PeerTracker	PHP	GPL-3.0-or-later	Yes		Web application	Extremely lightweight and efficient BitTorrent tracker. Supports SQLite3, and MySQL for storage.
μTorrent	C++	Freeware	Yes		Windows, OS X, Linux, Android	Does not have a list of hosted torrents.
qBittorrent	C++	GPL-2.0-or-later	Yes	Yes	Windows, OS X, Unix-like, OS/2	Lightweight. Supports DHT, PEX, announcements via UDP. Does not have a web interface or list of hosted torrents; it is not designed for secure or large-scale application.
Vuze	Java	Disputed	Yes		Windows, Mac OS, Linux	Vuze (formerly Azureus) has a built in tracker.
Torrust-Tracker	Rust	AGPL-3.0-or-later	Yes	Yes	Windows, Mac OS, Linux	Open source tracker and indexer.
Torrust-Actix	Rust	MIT	Yes	Yes	Windows, Mac OS, Linux	Open source tracker server, very light in resources and stable.
