= BTDigg =

Search engine

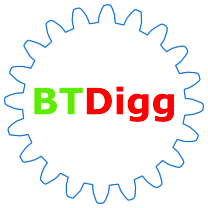
- Website type: BitTorrent DHT search engine, magnet links provider
- Available in: Multilingual, not English
- Website: btdigggink2pdqzqrik3blmqemsbntpzwxottujilcdjfz56jumzfsyd.onion ^{(Accessing link help)}
- Registration: Not required
- Launched: January 2011; 15 years ago
- Current status: Online

BTDigg is the first Mainline DHT search engine. It participates in the BitTorrent DHT network, supporting the network and making correspondence between magnet links and a few torrent attributes (name, size, list of files) that are indexed and inserted into a database. For end users, BTDigg provides a full-text database search via a Web interface. The Web part of its search system retrieves proper information by a user's text query. The Web search supports queries in European and Asian languages. The project name is an acronym of BitTorrent Digger. (In this context, digger mean treasure-hunter.) It went offline in June 2016, reportedly due to index spam. However, as of 2025 the service is back online, albeit often inaccessible from standard clearnet connections because of IP filtering. The service can be accessed via the Tor network/Tor Browser.

== Features ==
BTDigg was created as a DHT search engine for free content for the BitTorrent network. The web part of the BTDigg search system provides magnet links and partial torrent information (name, list of files, size) from the database. The returned results are based on a user's text query. BTDigg's DHT search engine links two subjects that are partial information from a torrent and a magnet link, similar to the process of linking the content of a web page with a page URL. BTDigg also provides API for third-party applications. The site is also available via the I2P network and Tor.

BTDigg Web interface supports the Russian, Chinese, and Portuguese languages. Users can customize search results by choosing proper sort order in the web interface. Additional features are search API, API popularity, plugins for μTorrent and qBittorrent clients, Web browser OpenSearch plugin (for Internet Explorer, Google Chrome). API popularity gives a picture of changing popularity for a torrent in the BitTorrent DHT network.

== History of BTDigg ==
BTDigg was founded in January 2011. In March–April 2011, several new features were introduced, among them web plugin to search with one click, qBittorrent plugin, showing torrent info-hash as QR code picture, torrent fakes and duplicates detection, and charts of the popular torrents in soft real-time. In 2012, the website started to support SSL connections.

== Advantages and disadvantages ==
BTDigg provides decentralization of torrent index database creation, and the ability to show distributed ratings provided by users via μTorrent. There is no guarantee about content because BTDigg neither analyzes nor stores content. BTDigg is not a tracker because it does not participate in nor coordinate the BitTorrent swarm. It is not a BitTorrent index because it neither stores nor maintains a static list of torrents.
