= Pacific Century International, Ltd. v. Does =

Pacific Century International, Ltd. v. Does 1-101
- Court: United States District Court for the Northern District of California
- Full case name: Pacific Century International, Ltd. v. Does 1-101
- Decided: July 8, 2011
- Docket nos.: 4:11-cv-02533

Holding
- Multiple parties that distribute a copyrighted work over BitTorrent cannot be sued in a single case

Court membership
- Judge sitting: Donna M. Ryu

Keywords
- BitTorrent, Joinder, Expedited Discovery

Pacific Century International, Ltd. v. Does 1-101, No. 4:11-cv-02533 (N.D. Cal. July 8, 2011), is a court case where Pacific Century International requested to subpoena the names and identities of 101 BitTorrent users (elsewhere noted as Does) whose IP Addresses were tied to downloading one of their copyrighted works. The resulting court decision permitted Pacific Century International to subpoena the identity of Doe 1, but dismissed claims against Does 2-101 for failure to demonstrate that the Does had operated as a single group while distributing the torrent, preventing each users' subpoena request from being enjoined into a single court filing. This case set a precedent for disallowing filings against large groups of IP addresses used to distribute copyrighted works over peer-to-peer networks.

== Background ==
Pacific Century International controlled the copyright of Amateur Creampies -- Erin Stone ("the Work") and sought to reveal the identities of Does 1-101 who Pacific Century International contended had committed copyright infringement under 17 U.S.C. § 101-1322 by downloading and distributing Pacific Century International's work over BitTorrent. Pacific Century International discovered the defendants' IP addresses through its own investigations. In order to take legal action against the defendants, Pacific Century International sought to subpoena each defendant's ISP in order to obtain their "name, address, telephone number, e-mail address, and Media Access Control information". Due to the limited time ISPs keep such logs, Pacific Century International requested that expedited discovery be permitted.

== Court Findings ==
=== Expedited Discovery ===
In determining whether expedited discovery could be used to subpoena the identities of Does 1–101, the court considered Columbia Insurance Company, 185 F.R.D

People who have committed no wrong should be able to participate online without fear that someone who wishes to harass or embarrass them can file a frivolous lawsuit and thereby gain the power of the court's order to discover their identity. Thus some limiting principals should apply to the determination of whether discovery to uncover the identity of a defendant is warranted. The following safeguards will ensure that this unusual procedure will only be employed in cases where the plaintiff has in good faith exhausted traditional avenues for identifying a civil defendant ...

The court's justification for overcoming these safeguards and granting expedited discovery follows previous precedent set down by UMG Recordings, Inc. In this previous ruling, the courts determined a test for subpoenaing the identities of unnamed Does:

(1) a sufficiently "concrete showing of a prima facie claim of actionable harm," including the specific dates and times of the acts alleged; (2) "the specificity of the discovery request"; (3) the absence of alternative means of discovering the users' identities; (4) the centrality of the need for this information; and (5) in light of the terms of the users' ISP service agreement, their lack of a reasonable expectation of privacy with respect to the downloading and distribution of copyrighted works.

Following this same test, the court determined the plaintiff could subpoena the identities of the Does.

=== Joinder ===
While the court found that the identity tied to an IP address could be subpoenaed, it also restricted doing so for all users disseminating a file over a peer-to-peer network due to a lack of evidence that each defendant collaborated in the same crime. Specifically, the court cites Io Group, Inc. v. Does 1-435 which states that while users may download the same file, it does not necessarily indicate that they are "connected to the same transaction, occurrence or series of transactions of occurrences, or . . . show they specifically acted in concert.'" The court stated that if one swarm of users disseminates a low-quality version of a video, and a second swarm a high-quality version, the two cases cannot be joined as they participated in two separate crimes. The court therefore ordered on July 8 that Pacific Century's claims against Does 2-101 be dismissed for improper joinder, while allowing the subpoena for Doe 1 to move forward.

Pacific Century International countered that the Does listed as defendants did download exactly the same file, as indicated by the hash of the file being distributed. However, the court stated the mere distribution of the same file does not prove that the users of the peer-to-peer network operated in concert as a single swarm. Specifically, the court questioned whether a unique file uploaded to multiple trackers would result in non-overlapping swarms, or whether any scenario existed where even though the same file was distributed, disjoint swarms arose that would never interact. Due to a lack of evidence, the court ultimately concluded that simply downloading the same copyrighted file was not proof the users identified acted in concert, and therefore could not be combined into a single case.

== Related Cases ==
In a related case Pacific Century International v. Does 1-48, Pacific Century International requested to subpoena the identities of 48 Does for downloading and distributing a copyrighted work, Amateur Creampies - Farrah (Part 2), over BitTorrent. In the resulting decision, the court found the joinder of each Doe to be permissible based on evidence provided by Pacific Century International that each Doe distributed the file, as indicated by the file's hash, without further discussion on the possibility of multiple swarms.

== See also ==
- BitTorrent (protocol)
- μTorrent
- Io Group, Inc. v. Does 1-435
- Digital rights management
