= EXeem =

Peer-to-peer file sharing client

eXeem was a peer-to-peer (P2P) file sharing client using the BitTorrent protocol. eXeem was designed to replace the need for centralized trackers (servers which co-ordinate the transfer of metadata across a BitTorrent network). It largely failed to achieve this goal, and the project was canceled and eXeem's network was shut down by the end of 2005.

eXeem was written in C++ using the open source libtorrent library for its BitTorrent functionality.

== Overview ==
eXeem was created by Swarm Systems Inc. which is located in Saint Kitts and Nevis. The company employed Andrej Preston, the founder of Suprnova.org, as its spokesperson and public face of eXeem. Five thousand Suprnova.org users were selected to take part in a private beta test of eXeem before the public beta was released on January 21, 2005.

eXeem's developers expected to implement the following features:

- On-the-fly encryption and decryption
- Searching by file hash
- Quality of service features
- Proper Universal Plug and Play-support
- User comments & ratings, but only when the file has been downloaded (to prevent fake ratings)
- Minimum limited upload rate (5 kB/s) to stop leechers.

== Criticism ==
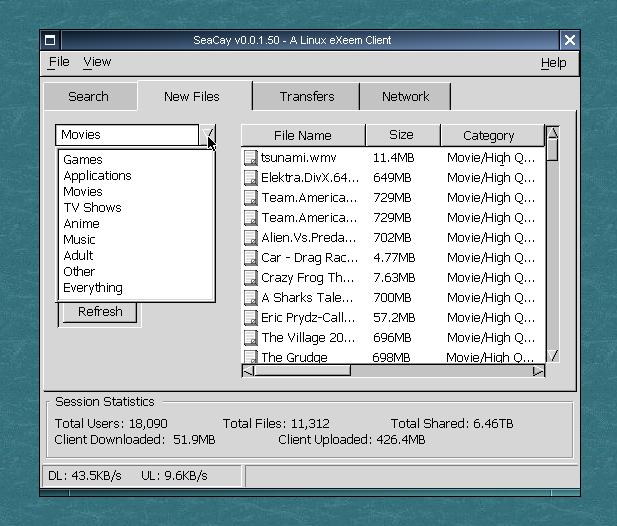
"Seacay", the unofficial Linux eXeem client

Criticism of eXeem arose soon after it debuted and included:

- eXeem's for-profit operating model, including support through advertising (much akin to Kazaa) and a public beta that included HTML ads supported by Cydoor, which is widely considered to be spyware. Ads-free versions called eXeem Lite and BIT eXeem were subsequently released, and eXeem later replaced Cydoor with WhenU from version 0.21 onward.
- Closed source code development, in contrast with the open-source model followed by the most popular BitTorrent software, on which eXeem is based.
- No initial Linux or Macintosh versions, with no ability to allow third parties to port the code beyond Windows (as eXeem is closed source).
- Seacay was released as a Linux Client for the eXeem network when eXeem version 0.21 was released (see screenshot, right )

== Network ==
The eXeem network used super-peers that were used to track torrents (as ordinary BitTorrent trackers). These super-peers were also responsible for maintaining file lists, comments and ratings for part of the files in the network. When a peer that was tracking a torrent was closed or went down, a new peer was assigned to be the tracker for that particular torrent.

== See also ==
- Distributed hash table (DHT) used in trackerless torrents
- Peer exchange (PEX) used in trackerless torrents
