= Seedbox =

Server used for the safe distribution of digital files

A seedbox is a high-bandwidth remote server for uploading and downloading of digital files from a P2P network. The bandwidth ranges generally from 100 Mbit/s to 100 Gbit/s. After the seedbox has acquired the files, people with access to the seedbox can download the files to their personal computers.

== Function ==
Seedboxes generally use the BitTorrent protocol, although they have also been used on the eDonkey2000 network. Seedboxes are usually connected to a high-speed network, often with a throughput of 100 Mbit/s or even 10 Gbit/s. Some providers are testing and offering 50 Gbit/s shared servers to 100 Gbit/s, while others are developing other systems that will allow users to scale their needs on the fly. Once the seedbox has a full copy of the files, they can be downloaded at high speeds to a user's personal computer via the HTTP, FTP (including FXP), SFTP, or rsync protocols. This allows for anonymity and, usually, removes the need to worry about share ratio. More expensive seedboxes may support VNC or Remote Desktop Protocol, allowing many popular clients to be run remotely. Other seedboxes are special-purpose and run a variety of torrent-specific software including web interfaces of popular clients like Transmission, rTorrent, Deluge, and μTorrent, as well as the TorrentFlux web interface clients. Mobile interface support is also offered by clients such as Transmission.

Seedboxes on high-speed networks are typically able to download large files very quickly, provided that the swarm can actually handle such a high upload bandwidth. For example, a seedbox with a transfer rate of 300 Mbit/s can finish downloading a 1 GB file in under half a minute. That same 1 GB file can be uploaded to other users in the same amount of time, creating a 1:1 share ratio for that individual file. The ability to transfer files so quickly makes them very attractive to the P2P communities. In some instances, a purchase of a seedbox will provide the owner with a private torrent tracker invite. Because of the mentioned high speeds, seedboxes tend to be popular when using private torrent trackers, where maintaining a share ratio above 1 can be very important.

Seedboxes are also used to circumvent bandwidth throttling by Internet service providers or to evade laws such as the HADOPI law in France.
