= US Copyright Group =

American company

The US Copyright Group (UCSG) is a business registered by the law firm Dunlap, Grubb & Weaver that also operates under the name SaveCinema.org. It is engaged in suing people in the U.S. who have allegedly used the P2P file sharing protocol BitTorrent to download certain movies.

The group uses custom software that monitors bittorrent swarms of selected movies, records IP addresses of the file sharers, files suit in order to obtain subpoenas to force ISPs to release the identities of the users, and then sends out letters to these users threatening to sue and offering settlements in the $1,000 to $3,000 range. It works for a number of independent film makers (but not for the Motion Picture Association of America); involved movies include The Hurt Locker, The Steam Experiment, Uncross the Stars, The Gray Man, Call of the Wild, Far Cry, Cornered!, Familiar Strangers, The Expendables, as well as the porn movies Tokyo Cougar Creampies and Teen Paradise 4. The group does not charge up front for its services but takes a percentage of the revenue.

UCSG began operation in January 2010 and by September 2010 it had filed suit against 16,200 people.

The EFF, ACLU and Time Warner have joined forces to try to quash most of the lawsuits. The ACLU and EFF argued that the lawsuits were not closely related and therefore improperly joined, and that it was improper to file all suits in Washington DC even though most of the alleged offenders resided elsewhere. Time Warner argued that it could only handle 28 IP address lookup requests per month. In July 2010, the Washington D.C. District Court judge rejected these arguments, but ordered UCSG, EFF and ACLU to work together to draft notification letters to be sent to the targeted individuals by their ISPs. The letters would inform them about the process and their legal options to fight the subpoena and would have to be approved by the court.

Also in July 2010, it was discovered that UCSG had copied parts of its website from a competitor without permission.

In September 2010, the website of Dunlap, Grubb, and Weaver was attacked as part of Operation Payback; they also received an e-mailed bomb threat forcing the evacuation of the office.

A lawyer who sold self-help legal kits for people sued by the US Copyright Group was subsequently sued by the group.

A lawsuit was filed against the US Copyright Group in November 2010, alleging that the group engages in fraud and extortion by offering settlements without full intent to sue and by having falsified a movie's date of first publication, among other things.

A setback came in December 2010: the group had filed suit against 4,577 "John Doe" alleged downloaders of the movie Far Cry in Washington D.C. District Court, but the judge dropped all cases against defendants not known to reside in Washington D.C. However, in February 2011 a Washington D.C. federal judge (who had previously worked as a lobbyist for the RIAA) declined a request to stop issuing subpoenas against John Does.

The business model used by the US Copyright Group has been used before in Germany and by the law firm ACS Law in the UK. (ACS Law went out of business in February 2011 and hearings into allegations of professional misconduct of two of its former partners have been scheduled.) Several lawyers in the U.S. working on behalf of porn movie producers have since started to employ the same strategy.

In May 2011 a blind man was notified that Imperial Enterprises (represented by Dunlap, Grubb, and Weaver) had filed a lawsuit against him claiming his internet connection had been used to download a porn movie.

== See also ==
- Legal issues with BitTorrent
- Peer-to-peer file sharing
