= Phoenix Labs (software) =

Software developers

Phoenix Labs (formerly Methlabs) was a software developing community founded by Tim Leonard and Ken McClelland and best known for PeerGuardian, an open-source software program optimized for use as a personal firewall on file sharing networks.

== History ==
The group was originally organized to work on PeerGuardian, a program Leonard created in 2003 in response to the shutdown of the Audiogalaxy file sharing site. The name Methlabs came from Leonard's handle, 'method'. In late 2004, the group added Blocklist.org, a website designed to allow users to interactively manage and block the IP addresses of certain organisations and companies.

Phoenix Labs was formed in September 2005 following a dispute between members of the Methlabs team. According to a Phoenix Labs press release, a "series of threats and incidents" forced most of the group out of the methlabs.org website. The press release attributed this action to a team member with responsibility for finances and server control. Based on information from other participants, internet news sources identified this person as using the nickname "Cerberius", but Cerberius reportedly disputed their charges of domain hijacking and described the situation as a "revolt". Method and a few members of the group decided they could not get the methlabs.com domain back, and decided took suggestions for a new name on their IRC channel. A user named 'bizzyb0t' came up with the name "phoenixlabs.org" to represent the group being reborn "rising from the ashes".

== Products ==
PeerGuardian and PeerGuardian 2 are free and open source programs capable of blocking incoming and outgoing connections based on IP blocklists. Their purpose is to block several organizations, including the RIAA and MPAA while using file sharing networks such as FastTrack and BitTorrent. The system is also advertising, spyware, government and educational ranges, depending upon user preferences.

Other programs developed by Phoenix Labs are XS, a file-sharing hub and client, and DeepDelete, a program for erasing files securely and make them extremely difficult to recover. The latter is no longer under development.
