= Academic Torrents =

File-sharing website

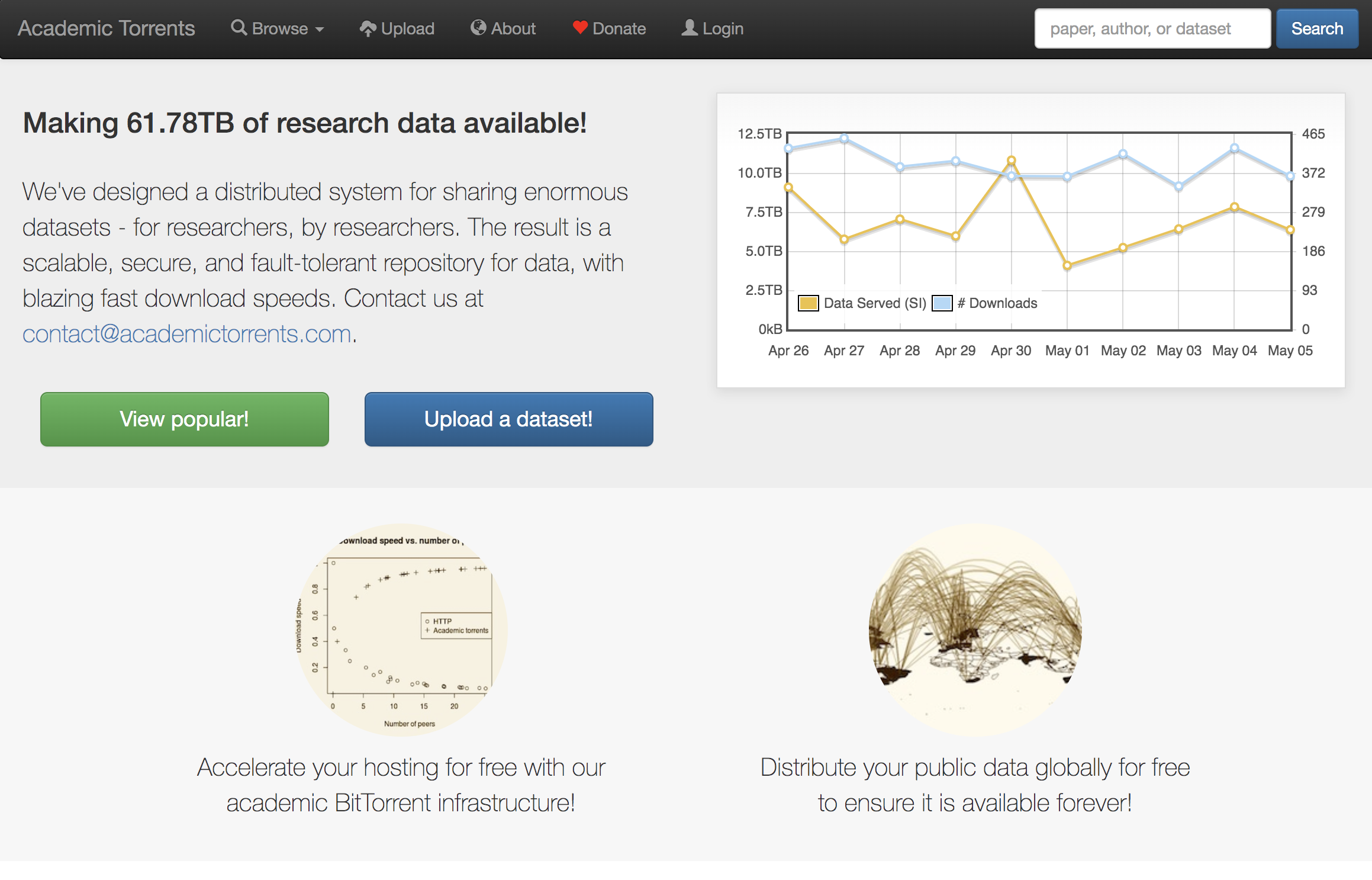
- Website type: BitTorrent tracker; Digital library
- Country of origin: United States
- Owner: Institute for Reproducible Research
- Founders: Joseph Paul Cohen; Henry Z Lo
- Industry: Non-profit
- Website: academictorrents.com
- Launched: 2013
- Current status: Active

Academic Torrents is a website which enables the sharing of research data using the BitTorrent protocol. The site was founded in November 2013, and is a project of the Institute for Reproducible Research (a 501(c)3 U.S. non-profit corporation). The project is said to be similar to LOCKSS but with a focus on "offering researchers the opportunity to distribute the hosting of their papers and datasets to authors and readers, providing easy access to scholarly works and simultaneously backing them up on computers around the world."

== Notable datasets ==
=== Developing Human Connectome Project ===
The developing Human Connectome Project related to the Human Connectome Project uses the platform. "Researchers from three leading British institutions are using BitTorrent to share over 150 GB of unique high-resolution brain scans of unborn babies with colleagues worldwide... The researchers opted to go for the Academic Torrents tracker, which specializes in sharing research data"

=== CrossRef metadata ===
The site hosts public metadata releases from Crossref which contain over 120+ million metadata records for scholarly work, each with a DOI. This was done so to allow the community to work with the entire database programmatically instead of using their API. "The sheer number of records means that, though anyone can use these records anytime, downloading them all via our APIs can be quite time-consuming. We hope this saves the research community valuable time during this crisis."

== See also ==
- Digital library
- Digital preservation
