= OBT =

OBT may refer to:

- OpenBitTorrent
- Opportunities for a Better Tomorrow
- Oregon Ballet Theatre
- Orange Blossom Trail, a road in Osceola and Orange Counties, Florida
- Orange Baboon Tarantula, also known as Pterinochilus murinus
- .OBT, a filename extension used by Microsoft Binder
- Obsession Beats Talent, a Professional Wrestling Stable from Spain.
- Organically-Bound Tritium
