= PeerTracker =

BitTorrent peer tracker software

- Release: October 24, 2009
- Stable release: 0.1.3 / January 20, 2010; 16 years ago
- Written in: PHP
- Operating system: Cross-platform
- Type: BitTorrent tracker
- License: GPL-3.0-or-later
- Website: github.com/JonnyJD/peertracker

PeerTracker is a free (licensed as GPL) BitTorrent peer tracker software written in PHP that is designed to be fast and to have a low consumption of system resources.

== Details ==
The focus of this project is to create a tracker in PHP that is fast, uses minimal server resources meanwhile providing full scale tracking capabilities.

PeerTracker does not concern itself with the indexing or uploading of torrents, nor with share ratio monitoring or any other form of user management.

It has been designed from the ground up to be easily deployed and operated from any shared or dedicated hosting environment.

== Features ==
- Operates under BEP 3, additionally supporting BEP 23
- Code is fully PHP 5+ E_STRICT & E_DEPRECATED compliant.
- profiled and optimized for extremely fast execution and minimal cpu/memory/database usage

== Requirements ==
- HTTP Server (Apache, nginx, lighttpd, Hiawatha, Cherokee etc...)
- PHP 5 (Recommend PHP 5.3+)
- Access to one of the below Databases
  - SQLite3 (Integrated in PHP 5.3+)
  - MySQL 4.1 (Recommend MySQL 5.1+)
  - PostgreSQL (Coming Soon)
  - txtSQL (Coming Soon)
