= Medvin =

Medvin is a surname. Notable people with the surname include:

- Marina Medvin, American attorney
- Scott Medvin (born 1961), American baseball pitcher
