= T411 =

BitTorrent metasearch engine

t411
- Website type: Torrent index
- Available in: 5 Languages, primarily French
- Dissolved: June 27, 2017; 9 years ago
- Registration: Required
- Users: 5 million
- Launched: 2008; 18 years ago
- Current status: ▼ Tracker forcibly shut down

t411 or Torrent411 was a semi-private BitTorrent tracker website founded in 2008. According to Alexa Internet, it was the 86th most visited website in France in December 2014, and the first in its category.

On the 27th of June 2017, t411 was shut down in a joint operation by French and Swedish police.

== History ==
In 2006 a BitTorrent tracker named QuebecTorrent (in reference to Quebec) was created. In July 2008, QuebecTorrent was shut down by the Canadian authorities. Shortly after being shut down a clone of the original website was created and named Torrent411. Torrent411 was developed by part of the team that created QuebecTorrent and they maintain the website, torrents, and members. The website's slogan is "Les pages jaunes du torrent", or "The Yellow Pages of the Torrent" in English; the 411 in Torrent411 refers to the "White Pages" telephone directory information number in Canada.

In August 2011 Torrent411 moved to the new domain name t411.me to avoid possible censure by VeriSign, the US company that manages the .com top-level domain.

In June 2013, T411 had surpassed 5 million members, confirming its position as the first francophone tracker.

On October 29, 2014, the site suffered a massive DDOS attack.

On February 20, 2015, t411.me becomes t411.io in response to a threat of blocking the domain name.

On April 2, 2015, a French court ordered the French DNS providers to block t411.me, following a complaint from the SCPP.

On June 27, 2017, t411 was shut down in a joint operation by French and Swedish police.
