= MoBlock =

Firewall software

- Original author: Enrico Butera
- Final release: 0.9 / October 2007
- Operating system: Linux
- Available in: C
- Type: Firewalls
- License: GPL
- Website: moblock.berlios.de

MoBlock was free software for blocking connections to and from a specified range of hosts. MoBlock was an IP address filtering program for Linux that is similar to PeerGuardian for Microsoft Windows. Its development was stopped in favor of Phoenix Labs' official PeerGuardian Linux and parts of its code have been merged in PeerGuardian Linux.

== See also ==
- PeerGuardian
- iplist
