= OpenBitTorrent =

Open BitTorrent tracker

- Website type: BitTorrent tracker
- Available in: English
- Website: openbittorrent.com
- Commercial: No
- Registration: No
- Current status: Offline (Web) Offline (Tracker)

OpenBitTorrent (commonly abbreviated OBT) is an open BitTorrent tracker project for the BitTorrent protocol.

== Description ==
OpenBitTorrent's initiative to provide a free, stable service with no ties to indexing sites or even hosting torrent files has been a public success and it has spawned several copies with almost identical services.

OpenBitTorrent has been suspected of being a part of, or a side project of, The Pirate Bay, because it was observed early on that both sites used the same trackers. The OpenBitTorrent project has countered by stating that the sites merely shared a tracker cluster operated by DCP Networks and Fredrik Neij during a startup period (February through August 2009).

On 22 May 2010, the OpenBitTorrent tracker was shut down. This was a result of a case against The Pirate Bay by many major Hollywood studios. Later the tracker came back online.

OpenBitTorrent is powered by the opentracker software. The Pirate Bay also used the opentracker software, before they shut down their own tracker.

From 16 July to 2 August 2012, OpenBitTorrent went offline protesting the lack of adoption of a protocol improvement by the makers of uTorrent, that was proposed by Pirate Bay co-founder Fredrik Neij. As a result of the protest, many people had trouble downloading files on BitTorrent.

From 5 December to 30 December 2014, the OpenBitTorrent website and tracker was unreachable, this may have been linked to the arrest of Pirate Bay co-founder Fredrik Neij.

On 5 May 2015, the OpenBitTorrent tracker was back online although the website still did not display the tracker address.

The website was shut down again in July 2017, but came back online for a while in late 2018 and was unresponsive again in late 2019.

In 2020, the website was redirecting to Opentracker, another torrent tracker. However a year later in January 2021, OpenBitTorrent came back online again with its own tracker and website.

== See also ==
- Comparison of BitTorrent sites
