= BitTorious =

BitTorious is a combination open-source BitTorrent Tracker and web-based management portal released in 2014 by Preston Lee from the Biomedical Informatics Department at Arizona State University. The primary difference between BitTorious' integrated tracker and other available trackers is the addition of a role-based permissions model and feed-based organization system. The source code is written in AngularJS, Ruby on Rails and PostgreSQL, and may be run on Linux, Windows or OS X server environments.

== Major releases ==
=== v3.0.0 ===
BitTorious v3 is the current production release. Major differences include tracker support for "volunteer" clients, as well as corresponding configuration options in the web-based user interface. Its release coincides with an academic publication entitled "BitTorious volunteer: server-side extensions for centrally-managed volunteer storage in BitTorrent swarms" published November 4, 2015.

=== v2.0.0 ===
Release of 2.0.0 was a rewrite of a previously unpublished v1.0.0, and marked by the publication of a paper entitled "BitTorious: global controlled genomics data publication, research and archiving via BitTorrent extensions" in BMC Bioinformatics on October 7, 2014.

== Academics ==
The design of BitTorious was initially intended to be used by private groups of collaborators needing to frequently exchange large data payloads, as is common in genomics, proteomics, and other data-intensive fields. The software's generic design, however, allows for usage in any domain.
