= Retspan =

RetSpan was a French anti-copyright infringement organisation that attempted to shut down SuprNova for copyright violations in 2004.

It has been denounced as a possible fraud.
