= Chan Nai-ming =

Chan Nai-Ming
- Other names: The Big Crook, Master of Cunning (Chinese: 古惑天皇)
- Criminal charges: copyright infringement
- Criminal penalty: 3 months imprisonment

Chan Nai-Ming (Chinese: 陳乃明) is a Hong Kong citizen, believed to be the first person in the world convicted of the crime of illegal mass distribution of copyrighted works using BitTorrent Peer-to-peer file sharing. Chan was 38 years old and unemployed at the time of his arrest.

== Alleged incident ==
Chan Nai-Ming was accused of uploading three Hollywood films (Daredevil, Miss Congeniality and Red Planet) onto the Internet using BitTorrent under the web handle 古惑天皇, which can be translated as either “Master of Cunning” or “Big Crook”.

== Trial ==
He was charged with 3 counts of “attempting to distribute an infringing copy of a copyright work (otherwise than for the purpose of, in the course of, any trade or business) to such an extent as to affect prejudicially the owner of the copyright, without the licence of the copyright owner, contrary to sections 118(1)(f) and 119(1) of the Copyright Ordinance, Cap. 528 and section 159G of the Crimes Ordinance, Cap. 200” and 3 counts of an alternative charge of “Obtaining access to a computer with dishonest intent, contrary to section 161(1)(c) of the Crimes Ordinance, Cap. 200”. Since the first 3 charges were proven, the last 3 charges were dropped.

Chan was sentenced to three months in prison on 7 November 2005. The maximum penalty under law was four years in prison.

At the Tuen Mun Magistracy, Magistrate Colin Mackintosh said that he had reduced the term because this was Chan's first offence and the first sentencing for such a case in the world. However, the judge claimed that anyone else caught illegally sharing files in the wake of his judgment could expect tougher treatment.

== Appeals ==
He was released on bail for HK$5000 while waiting for the results of the appeal to the High Court. On 12 December 2006, the High Court upheld the original verdict and sentence. He was jailed immediately.

The High Court denied him leave to appeal to the Court of Final Appeal, but he was bailed for HK$5000 on 3 January 2007 to seek leave for appeal at the CFA (leave can be granted by either the High Court or the CFA). On 7 February, the CFA granted him leave. Oral arguments were held on 9 May 2007. Chan's lawyer said the word "copies" only refers to tangible objects like CDs and tapes. Digital files don't count. He also said that UK law distinguish between the two by having separate "Distribution Right" for tangible objects and "Communication Right" for intangible files. Also, it is the downloader that initiated the transfer, thereby copying the work. Chan merely put it on the net. The government's lawyers disagreed. The decision is reserved.

The judge from the court of final appeal ruled out Chan's appeal on 18 May 2007. The result was that Chan's appeal was rejected, and the original sentence (3 months in jail) was upheld.
