= ArenaBG =

Bulgarian BitTorrent tracker

- Website type: Torrent index
- Owner: Elian Geshev
- Creators: payforfree, csdemo, fogost, mapko
- Website: arenabg.com/en/
- Registration: Open
- Launched: 2008
- Current status: Seized

ArenaBG was a Bulgarian BitTorrent tracker based in Frisco, Texas in the United States.

== Current accessibility situation ==
Because of the current police investigations against ArenaBG, access to the site was restricted outside Bulgaria. Now it can be accessed from everywhere. ArenaBG has pioneered a new initiative, which aims to make the torrents accessible without their own tracker through using FlashGet's DHT connections. In June 2007, a new site of ArenaBG has been published. It offers better functionality, smoother interface and complete English menus. The old website was set to close in July, but it's still fully working. Old user accounts are not compatible with the new site, thus new free registration is required.

In the beginning of October 2008 the p2p section of the site was inaccessible for a short period of time due to a court case outcome ordering ISP provider (Leaseweb) to take down such sites. The site 100% "functionality" was restored in approximately a week time. Current ArenaBG website page was shut down.

The site became functional as of 2 April 2011 after being offline since January 1, 2011. In 2010 access was denied in some countries, which national law may provide civil or criminal sanctions even for infringements of copyright law for non-commercial purposes.

In January 2026 the domain has been seized by authorities.
