= PeerBlock =

Personal firewall software

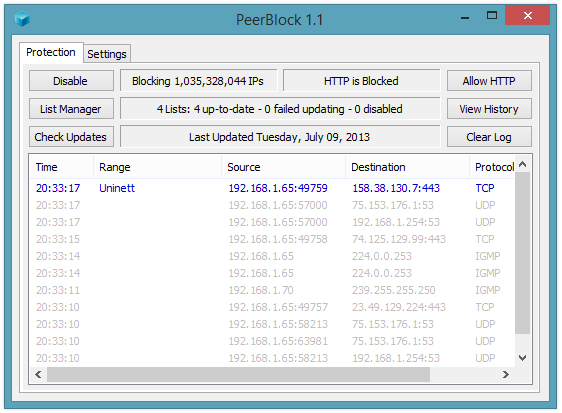
- PeerBlock 1.1 on Windows 8.1
- Developers: Mark Bulas, "night_stalker_z", "XhmikosR"
- Initial release: September 27, 2009; 16 years ago
- Final release: 1.2 / January 14, 2014; 11 years ago
- Repository: code.google.com/archive/p/peerblock/; sourceforge.net/projects/peerblock/
- Written in: C++
- Operating system: Microsoft Windows
- Available in: English
- Type: Firewall
- License: GPL or zlib License
- Website: peerblock.com

PeerBlock is a free and open-source personal firewall that blocks packets coming from, or going to, a maintained list of blacklisted hosts. PeerBlock is the Windows successor to the software PeerGuardian (which is currently maintained only for Linux). It blocks incoming and outgoing connections to IP addresses that are included on blacklists (made available on the Internet), and to addresses specified by the user. PeerBlock mainly uses blacklists provided by iblocklist.com.

== Development ==
PeerBlock 1.0 is based on the same code as PeerGuardian 2 RC1 Test3 Vista version. It adds support for 32- and 64-bit Windows Vista, Windows 7, and Windows 8. When the PeerGuardian project ended, its developer Phoenix Labs encouraged current PeerGuardian users to migrate to PeerBlock.

PeerBlock is under development by a small team of developers led by Mark Bulas. Hosting, as well as the signed driver, is funded by donations from the public. Future donations are intended to contribute to future signed drivers, hosting and to possibly rent a virtual private server on which the team should be able to build a "real" online-update feature for future releases of PeerBlock.

== Features ==
PeerBlock has added multiple features in the latest version of the program. Such as a constantly updating blocklist managed by the home site and a manager that lets you choose which lists to include in the block. The program allows for a user to turn on and off both IP and HTTP trackers as well as including a log showing the time, source, IP address, destination, and protocol of the tracker. A list of settings allows users to both customize their program's interface as well as its operations.

Until September 2013, I-Blocklist, the supplier of the blocking lists PeerBlock uses, supported unlimited free list updating. Since September 2013 updates were limited to once weekly, except to paid subscribers. PeerBlock is hard-coded to use I-Blocklist lists and has entered into a revenue-sharing agreement with I-Blocklist. In late 2015 blocklists were no longer available without payment of a subscription.
