= LokiTorrent =

- Owner: Edward Webber
- Creator: Edward Webber
- Launched: 24 February 2004; 22 years ago
- Current status: Offline

LokiTorrent was a BitTorrent indexing service operated by Edward Webber ("Lowkee") from 2004 until 2005. The domain name was originally registered on 24 February 2004.

In the beginning, LokiTorrent had been one of the least trafficked torrent sites, with operations like Suprnova.org leading the pack at the time. However, LokiTorrent gained international attention when it refused to comply with cease and desist orders sent out on 14 December 2004 by the MPAA. These same orders had caused dozens of other much larger sites, including SuprNova, to disappear overnight.

Webber began a drive to raise money to fight the MPAA in court, and over a couple of months, had accrued in excess of $40,000 in sheer member donations. The site peaked at 680,000 active registered members, and dealt with 1.8 million hits per day.

== Attempt to sell domain ==
The domain for LokiTorrent was discovered for sale on US Netco Sedo on 27 January 2005, and Webber fell under heavy scrutiny by the online forum community. Webber claimed to be "testing the waters", just to see what such a popular site would be worth. Webber is quoted as typing the following as to what price he would sell the domain for: "If some guy offers me $75K for the domain name, he's more than welcome to it, and I'll simply move the site to a different domain. Selling the entire site will never happen. I have way too much of myself in this site to sell it for any price (well, 2 million could get me to part with it, lol.. but let's live in reality)".

== Shutdown ==
On 10 February 2005, LokiTorrent shut down after an extended outage. This move coincided with the MPAA's second round of lawsuits against BitTorrent and eDonkey hub operators. The content of the LokiTorrent website was replaced with the splash screen signature of the MPAA's anti-piracy campaign, reading "You can click, but you can't hide."

=== Questions as to legitimacy ===
The news of the shutdown was quick to explode on forums like Slyck, and user-driven content sites like Slashdot. It was also revealed that the server logs had been obtained. The fact that not much was immediately known, coupled with the inopportune timing (losing credibility over the SEDO incident) caused the rumor mill to begin churning, and users became angry and panicked. The initial reaction by the internet community was that Webber had never actually been on the MPAA's radar, and took all of the donation money for himself, shut the site down and fled once he realized he was losing credibility. Another common suggestion, by those who believed the MPAA was indeed involved, was that the MPAA had actually offered to end their case with Webber as long as he agreed to turn over the server logs and discontinue his site. Some also speculated that the entire existence of LokiTorrent had been an inside job to catch pirates, orchestrated by the MPAA (hence why it was the only one which stayed open after the round of lawsuits in December), and that Webber himself was nothing more than a fictional character. Conspiracists from all sides charged that the DNS server entries had not changed after the downtime and subsequent posting of the shutdown notice on the site, indicating that one party had been in control of the site's content all along.

A couple of weeks after the shutdown, news hit that the MPAA lawsuit was not a hoax after all, citing court documents, complete with United States District Judge David C. Godbey's signature as proof. However, to this day, it is unknown whether Webber kept the member-donated funds for himself, or if all of the money was taken by the MPAA.

== See also ==
- File sharing
