= Combined Online Information System =

British government database

The Combined Online Information System (COINS) is a database containing HM Treasury's detailed analysis of departmental spending under thousands of category headings. The database contains around 24 million lines of data. The database has codes for more than 1,700 public bodies in the United Kingdom including central government departments, local authorities, NHS trusts and public corporations. COINS is used by the Office for National Statistics for statistical purposes.

The Treasury describes the database as "a web based multi-dimensional database used by HM Treasury to collect financial information". Data from the COINS database is used to prepare the National Accounts.

== Structure and technical details ==
The Combined Online Information System or COINS database is one of the biggest datasets in government. COINS uses a database called Camelot. The system is supplied by Descisys.

== History ==
COINS replaced three separate systems previously used by the British Government, Public Expenditure System (PES), Government Online Data System (GOLD) and General Expenditure Monitoring System (GEMS).

== Disclosure ==
The Treasury turned down requests under the Freedom of Information Act 2000 for data contained in COINS prior to the 2010 United Kingdom general election. After promises during the election campaign to publish the database if elected, the Cameron–Clegg coalition government made available all 120 GB of COINS data in a raw format as of 4 June 2010. The hope is that this will spur third party organisations to find innovative ways to present this information to the public.
