= Marina Medvin =

American criminal defense attorney

- Education: Pennsylvania State University (BS) George Mason University School of Law (JD)
- Occupations: Criminal defense attorney, columnist

Marina Medvin is an American criminal defense attorney located in Alexandria, Virginia.

== Early life and education ==
Marina Medvin was born in the USSR and emigrated with her parents to the United States as a child. She received a Bachelor of Science degree from the Pennsylvania State University in 2006, having attended its College of Information Sciences and Technology. She received her Juris Doctor from the George Mason University Antonin Scalia Law School.

== Career and politics ==
Medvin is a trial lawyer licensed to practice law in Virginia, the District of Columbia, and Texas. Medvin specializes in criminal defense. She is also a former senior columnist at Townhall, contributed a column to Forbes, and provides legal analysis to news outlets.

=== January 6 Capitol cases ===
Medvin has represented some of the defendants charged with crimes arising from the January 6, 2021 attack on the U.S. Capitol.

Her cases of note include:

- Jenny Cudd, a Midland, Texas florist who bragged about her participation in the riot and received permission to travel to Mexico in the middle of her prosecution, obtained a dismissal of a felony charge and was sentenced to a fine and two months of probation on a misdemeanor. Medvin filed a motion to change venue in Cudd’s case, the first such motion filed in January 6 cases, which was later copied by other defendants, but none of these motions were granted.
- John Steven Anderson, of Saint Augustine, Florida, who was charged with civil disorder and assaulting police in a tunnel of the Capitol. He died in 2021 before the case could come to trial.
- Mark Ibrahim, of Orange County, California, a former DEA agent who was indicted in July 2021 on three felonies and a misdemeanor, including illegally carrying a firearm onto Capitol grounds, climbing on a statue during riot, and making false statements to FBI agents in a March 2021 interview. In a rare pre-trial motion win among Capitol riot defendants, Medvin secured dismissal of the count against Ibrahim alleging that he lied to the FBI; however, Medvin's bid to dismiss the other counts was rejected.
- Christopher Warnagiris, of Woodbridge, Virginia, a U.S. Marine Corps major who is the highest-ranking active-duty military officer charged in the January 6 insurrection. Warnagiris pleaded not guilty to nine counts, including assaulting an officer and civil disorder.
- Christopher Kuehne, a Kansas City-area man charged with the Kansas City Proud Boys, who pleaded guilty to one count of civil disorder.
- David and Nicholas Krauss, a father and son from New Jersey, who entered the Capitol together; they were sentenced to 9 months of probation. In court filings, Medvin argued that the Capitol riot sentences were unfair and politically motivated. She accused the DOJ of political bias.
- Christopher Carnell, of North Carolina, who walked into the Capitol Building wearing a backpack with his name embroidered on it.
- Robert Norwood, of South Carolina, who was arrested after boasting to family members about his participation in the Capitol riot.
- Michael Stepakoff, of Florida, who pleaded guilty to a misdemeanor ("parading, demonstrating or picketing" in the Capitol building) and was sentenced to 12 months' probation.
- Matthew DaSilva, a Navy veteran from Texas, who was convicted of some of his charges after a bench trial and is awaiting sentencing. Medvin argued in her sentencing memo that her client and other January 6 defendants were unfairly singled out by the government, saying, "the DOJ has created unique public-shaming web pages for every January 6 defendant, a digital version of tar and feathering,” something that the government has not done in the past for other criminal defendants.
- Tyler Campanella, the stepson of former "Real Housewives" cast member Sigalit "Siggy" Flicker, who is accused of entering the Capitol on January 6.
- Kimberly Sylvester, a grandmother who remained in the Capitol for almost one hour, was sentenced to 12 months of probation.
- Todd Michael Bills, of Coldwater, Ohio, was charged with four misdemeanor charges - entering and remaining in a restricted building or grounds; disorderly and disruptive conduct in a restricted building or grounds; disorderly conduct in a Capitol building or grounds; and parading, demonstrating or picketing in a Capitol building.

=== Other cases ===
Medvin previously represented an FBI 10 Most Wanted fugitive; a defendant in the Anonymous Operation Payback case; and a student who hacked CIA Director John Brennan and published with WikiLeaks. Medvin also secured the dismissal of criminal charges for Harry Jackson, a local Virginia politician and father who was facing four misdemeanor charges for statements made on YouTube and on Twitter in which Jackson accused another activist of "grooming behavior" around children.

=== Politics ===
Medvin was listed as a conservative writer for Townhall and was referred to as a "conservative firebrand" by Politico. The December 2024 issue of the Washingtonian Magazine noted that Medvin "dedicated her large social media platform to advocacy for the [October 7] hostages."
