= ΜTorrent =

Proprietary adware BitTorrent client

μTorrent
- Original author: Ludvig Strigeus
- Developer: Rainberry, Inc.
- Release: September 18, 2005; 21 years ago

Stable release(s)
- Windows: 3.6.0.47006 / 11 January 2024; 2 years ago
- macOS: 1.8.7.45548 / 30 January 2020; 6 years ago
- Android: 8.2.2 / 21 March 2024; 2 years ago

Preview release(s) [±]
- 3.6.0 Beta (build 46588) (14 November 2022; 4 years ago) [±]
- Written in: C++
- Operating system: Android, Linux (Server version only, only officially supports very old versions of Debian and Ubuntu), Microsoft Windows, macOS
- Available in: 60+ languages
- Type: BitTorrent client
- License: Adware
- Website: www.utorrent.com

μTorrent, or uTorrent (see pronunciation), is a proprietary adware BitTorrent client owned and developed by Rainberry, Inc. The "μ" (Greek letter "mu") in its name comes from the SI prefix "micro-", referring to the program's small memory footprint: the program was designed to use minimal computer resources while offering functionality comparable to larger BitTorrent clients such as Vuze or BitComet. μTorrent became controversial in 2015 when many users unknowingly accepted a default option during installation which also installed a cryptocurrency miner.

The program has been in active development since its first release in 2005. Although originally developed by Ludvig Strigeus, since December 7, 2006, the code is owned and maintained by BitTorrent, Inc. The code has also been employed by BitTorrent, Inc. as the basis for version 6.0 and above of the BitTorrent client, a re-branded version of μTorrent. All versions are written in C++.

== History ==
=== Early development ===
Out of general discontent with bloatware, Serge Paquet suggested to Ludvig Strigeus that he should make a smaller and more efficient BitTorrent client. Strigeus began to conceptualize the plans for the program's development, which, at the time, did not include making the client feature-rich. After initially working on it for about a month during the last quarter of 2004 (the first build is dated October 17, 2004), mostly during his free time before and after work, Strigeus ceased coding μTorrent for a year. He resumed work on September 15, 2005, and three days later, the first public release (version 1.1 beta) was made available as free software, and began generating feedback.

=== PeerFactor SARL ===
On March 4, 2006, PeerFactor SARL announced the signing of a six-month contract with Strigeus for the development of "new content distribution applications on the Web". PeerFactor SARL was a relatively new company formed by former employees of PeerFactor, which was a subsidiary of the French anti-piracy organization Retspan.

Strigeus stated that his coding for PeerFactor SARL was to use his expertise in the optimization of the BitTorrent protocol to create a .dll which PeerFactor SARL intended to use as part of a distribution platform for files in a corporate setting. At the time there was some speculation that μTorrent may have been modified to spy on users on Peerfactor's behalf, however to date (even following μTorrent's acquisition by BitTorrent, Inc.) no evidence has been produced to support these allegations.

=== Ownership change ===
On December 7, 2006, μTorrent was purchased by BitTorrent, Inc. It was later announced that BitTorrent paid an undisclosed amount to Spotify for this purchase, the then owner of the software.

On September 18, 2007, BitTorrent 6.0 was released. Although previous versions of the BitTorrent client had been open source software, with version 6 it became proprietary.

In April 2017, BitTorrent founder Bram Cohen announced that the next version of μTorrent would be web browser based. This μTorrent version allows users to stream torrents from the default web browser, similar to a regular streaming site.

== Features ==
Features present in μTorrent include:

- Magnet Links (URIs), added in version 1.8, released on August 9, 2008.
- Teredo tunneling / IPv6 support
- Micro Transport Protocol (μTP) preliminary support as of 1.8.2 with full-support added in 2.0
- UPnP support for all versions of Windows, without needing Windows XP's UPnP framework
- Protocol encryption (PE)
- Peer exchange (PEX) with other BitTorrent clients:
  - libtorrent and clients based on it like Deluge or qBittorrent have full μTorrent PEX support
  - Transmission and clients based on libTransmission have full μTorrent PEX support
  - KTorrent has full μTorrent PEX support as of 2.1 RC1
  - Vuze, formerly Azureus, has full support as of version 3.0.4.3
- RSS ("broadcatching")
- "Trackerless" BitTorrent support using DHT, compatible with the original BitTorrent client and BitComet
- User configurable intelligent disk caching system
- Full proxy server support
- HTTPS tracker support
- Configurable bandwidth scheduler
- Localized for 67 languages.
- Initial seeding of torrents
- Customizable search bar & user interface design.
- Configuration settings and temporary files are stored in a single directory, allowing portable use
- WebUI: A plugin currently in beta testing that allows μTorrent running on one computer to be controlled from another computer, either across the internet or on a LAN, using a Web browser
- Embedded Tracker: a simple tracker designed for seeding torrents, lacking a web interface or list of hosted torrents. It is not designed for secure or large-scale application.
- Quick-resumes interrupted transfers
- Two "easter eggs" in the About subsection of Help: clicking the μTorrent logo plays a Deep Note-like sound effect, and typing the letter "t" starts a Tetris-like game called μTris, which in 2008 was selected as #1 of the "Top 10 Software Easter Eggs" by LifeHacker.
- The ability to use encryption of all traffic to bypass torrent blocking on the network.

=== Size ===
μTorrent is shipped as a single stand-alone compressed executable file, installed at first run. Recent versions have included the ability to install themselves on first run. Small executable size is achieved by avoiding the use of many libraries, notably the C++ standard library and stream facilities, and creating substitutes written specifically for the program. The executable is then compressed to roughly half of its compiled and linked size using UPX.

=== Operating system support ===
Screenshot of the macOS version of μTorrent (up to 0.9.2)

μTorrent is available for Microsoft Windows, macOS, and Android. A μTorrent Server is also available for Linux. Currently, μTorrent supports Windows XP or later, Mac OS X Snow Leopard or later, and Android 5.0 or later. The latest version for Windows XP is 3.5.5 build 45311 Stable dated July 22, 2019. However, the official termination of support for Windows XP has not been reported. On the official website of the program, this operating system is still listed as supported.

The first test version for macOS, running on Mac OS X Leopard, was released on 27 November 2008.

On September 2, 2010, the native Linux version of μTorrent Server was released. Firon, an administrator of the μTorrent community forum, said that they had been working on this project for a few months prior to the release as it was the most requested feature for some time. This release is intended for users who are seeking a fast command-line interface based BitTorrent client with a remote web-based management. They also mentioned that a full featured client with a GUI is a work in progress.

As of 2020, μTorrent server for Linux supports Debian 6.0 or later and Ubuntu 12 or later, with both 32-bit & 64-bit options available.

On August 1, 2019, μTorrent announced that users who upgrade to macOS Catalina will be upgraded to μTorrent web automatically since that version of macOS (and subsequent releases) supports 64-bit applications only.

== Revenue ==
In early versions by Strigeus, μTorrent displayed advertisements in a frame on the web browser by a built-in web redirection via nanotorrent for search queries entered through the search bar. Some users thought this suspicious because IP address tracking could be implemented by recording which machine was downloading/receiving the advertisements, and user-query tracking could easily be done through whichever web interface the client was using. After a short time, that method of advertising was disabled, mitigating those concerns.

A later version of the software displays advertisements (server-side) in a frame at the top of the browser each time the "search all sites" function is used. In version 1.5, no ads are present in the program itself.

As of build 463, a redirect bypass feature became available in the Advanced options.

As of version 1.8.2, the μTorrent installer downloads and installs the Ask.com toolbar on the first run of the program; the user can opt out of installing that toolbar by deselecting it before allowing the μTorrent installation to proceed. The developers stated the addition was needed for funds to continue development. In late 2010, the Ask.com toolbar was replaced with the Conduit Engine.

Currently, μTorrent generates revenue through in-content advertisements (in the free version for Windows) and the "pro" version, which is available in 3 bundles (available for both classic & web client for Windows).

=== Toolbars ===
In late 2010, some controversy arose with the release of μTorrent which included adware in the form of the Conduit Engine, which installed a toolbar, and made homepage and default search engine changes to a user's web browser. A number of users reported that the installation was made without the user's consent. There were some complaints that the adware software was difficult to remove. In 2011, μTorrent bundled the Bing Toolbar.

=== Paid version ===
On July 15, 2011, BitTorrent announced that they would offer a paid version of μTorrent called "μTorrent Plus". This new version would offer extra features, such as integrated file conversion, anti-virus, and a built-in media player. On 6 October 2011, the Pre-alpha of μTorrent Plus was released to an invitation-only community. As of December 2011, μTorrentPlus 3.1 was available for $24.95; as of December 2014, the Plus version was available as a $19.95 yearly subscription.

=== Ads and malware ===
In August 2012, BitTorrent announced the addition of advertising in the free version of μTorrent; each ad could only be dismissed after the user had viewed it. Due to response from users, a few days later, the company stated that ads could be optionally turned off. A user-created tool known as "Pimp My μTorrent" was also created to simplify the process of disabling ads in the Windows version. Starting with μTorrent version 3.2.2, the software also contains in-content advertisements described as "Featured Torrent". As with the other ads, it is possible to disable this content.

In March 2015, μTorrent began automatically installing a background application called Epic Scale to mine cryptocurrency for the benefit of BitTorrent, Inc., while allegedly giving a portion to charity. Epic Scale mines Litecoin using both CPU and GPU power, and is classified as "riskware" by some security programs. A μTorrent developer disputed whether the automatic installation was really automatic, and claimed that as with all other "partner" programs bundled with the software, users could decline the installation. On 28 March, Epic Scale was removed from the installation and dropped from the list of software bundle partners.

Beginning in 2018, advertisements for Yandex Browser and other Yandex-produced software were included in Russian and Ukrainian versions of μTorrent.

== Pronunciation ==
In 2005, an admin on the μTorrent forums wrote: "I don't really know how it's pronounced, I usually say 'you torrent' because it looks like a u". While stating they were not sure, they mentioned that the correct pronunciations for "μTorrent" could be "microtorrent", "mytorrent" (as "my" [myː] is the Swedish pronunciation of the Greek letter μ) and "mutorrent". In Greece, where the software was widely used, it is called me torrent, since the letter μ of the Greek Alphabet is pronounced mi in modern Greek. The symbol μ is the lowercase Greek letter mu, which stands for the SI prefix "micro-". It refers to the program's originally small footprint.

== Contributors ==
μTorrent was created and initially developed by Ludvig Strigeus ("ludde", from Sweden). Serge Paquet ("vurlix", from Canada) acted as release coordinator, and had intended to work on porting the software to Linux and macOS. He maintained the μTorrent website and forum until the end of 2005 but is no longer affiliated with μTorrent.

Since its purchase in 2006, development has been performed by various employees of Bittorrent Inc.; Strigeus is no longer affiliated with μTorrent.

== Reception ==
μTorrent has been praised for its small size and minimal computer resources used, which set it apart from other clients. PC Magazine stated that it "packs an outstanding array of features" in 2006 and listed it in their 2008 "Best free 157 software tools". It was also in PC World's "101 Fantastic freebies". The website TorrentFreak.com said it was the most feature rich BitTorrent client available, later summarizing a 2009 University of California, Riverside study which concluded that "μTorrent Download Speeds Beat Vuze By 16%" on average and "on 10% of [the 30 most used] ISPs, μTorrent users were downloading 30% faster than Vuze users". About.com said it was the best BitTorrent client available, citing its small size and "minimal impact to the rest of your computer's speed." Wired.com said its "memory footprint is also ridiculously small". PC & Tech Authority magazine (Australia) gave it 6 stars (out of 6). Lifehacker.com rated it the best BitTorrent client available (Windows) in 2008, 2011 (Windows and Mac) and a follow-up user poll rated it the most popular torrent client in 2015. CNET.com gave it 5 stars (of 5) saying it features "light and quick downloading".

In November 2009, 52 million users were reported to be using the application, and in late 2011, 132 million.

According to a study by Arbor Networks, the 2008 adoption of IPv6 by μTorrent caused a 15-fold increase in IPv6 traffic across the Internet over a ten-month period.

== See also ==
- Comparison of BitTorrent clients
