= Riskware =

Software that poses a risk to a host computer

Riskware, a portmanteau of risk and software, is a word used to describe software whose installation and execution poses a potential risk to a host computer. Relatively normal programs can often fall into the category of riskware as some applications can be modified for another purpose and used against the computer user or owner.

== Examples ==
While a wide variety of software may be considered riskware, one common example is remote desktop software. This type of software has both legitimate purposes, such as when used for remote technical support, but could also be used by an unauthorized user for malicious purposes.

== See also ==
- Ransomware
- Software cracking
- Remote desktop software
