= Mininova =

Dutch BitTorrent website, 2005 to 2017

Mininova B.V.

- Screenshot of mininova.org home page
- Company type: Besloten Vennootschap (private limited liability company)
- Website type: Torrent directory and search engine
- Available in: English
- Founded: January 2005; 21 years ago
- Dissolved: April 4, 2017
- Headquarters: Netherlands
- Key people: Erik Dubbelboer; Niek van der Maas
- Revenue: €1.1 million in 2007 (before taxes and expenses)
- Employees: 5
- Advertising: Banner / text ads
- Registration: Optional
- Launched: January 19, 2005; 21 years ago
- Current status: Offline

Mininova was a website offering BitTorrent downloads. Mininova was once one of the largest sites offering torrents of copyrighted material, but in November 2009, following legal action in the Dutch courts, the site operators deleted all torrent files uploaded by regular users including torrents that enabled users to download copyrighted material.

On April 4, 2017, Mininova shut down, saying that it had been running at a loss "for some years".

== Site history ==
The site was based in the Netherlands and was launched in January 2005 as a successor to Suprnova.org, which went offline at the end of 2004 following legal difficulties. In April 2007, Mininova B.V. (the company running Mininova.org) won a domain dispute about the domain mininova.com, which had been exploited by a phisher.

The word ‘mininova’ ranked 9 on Google's list of most queried terms in 2006. In May 2008, Mininova indicated that there had been over 5 billion downloads via the site. Mininova also ran a video sharing site, called Snotr.

=== Legal action ===
In May 2009, the Dutch copyright enforcement organization BREIN started a civil procedure against Mininova demanding that Mininova filter torrent files pointing to copyrighted works. During the proceedings, Mininova stated that it was not feasible for the site to identify such files, but said that it would remove torrent files that BREIN identified as infringing copyright. On May 6, 2009, Mininova began a trial of a content recognition system, which was intended to remove any torrents that were flagged as infringing copyright. On August 26, 2009, the court in Utrecht ruled that Mininova should remove all torrent files pointing to copyrighted material within three months or face damages of up to 5 million €.

On November 26, 2009, Mininova announced that it could not find a foolproof filtering system against copyrighted content, and limited its platform to Content Distribution torrents only, in compliance with the ruling of the Utrecht court. This resulted in more than 99.3% of the torrents on the site being removed. As a consequence, the website traffic dropped by 66% in a few days, and daily downloads fell down to 4% of the previous total. According to Alexa Internet, the daily traffic rank in the USA dropped from within the top 100 ranked sites in early November 2009 to below 1000 on January 30, 2010.

Mininova appealed against the court ruling, and in December 2010 reported that a settlement had been reached under which Mininova paid BREIN an undisclosed amount of money, ending the lawsuit.

== See also ==
- Comparison of BitTorrent sites
- Copyright infringement
- LimeWire
