= Suprnova.org =

BitTorrent tracker

- Website type: Torrent index
- Dissolved: 19 December 2004; 21 years ago
- Owner: Andrej Preston
- Creator: Andrej Preston
- Website: www.suprnova.org
- Launched: 2002; 24 years ago

Suprnova.org was a Slovenia-based website that distributed BitTorrent trackers for various music and video files, computer programs and games. Started in late 2002 by Andrej Preston (known as Slonček, Slovenian for "little elephant") and for a while considered the most popular BitTorrent search engine, Suprnova.org closed in late 2004 after legal threats. The site operators supported the development of the eXeem BitTorrent client software, deeming a fixed website too difficult to operate in the present legal climate. On 2 August 2007, the domain name was donated to The Pirate Bay, which relaunched the site on 21 August 2007.

== History 2002–2004 ==
The site first ran from Slonček's (site founder) home. As it grew fast it moved to professional servers. Suprnova did not host any of the shared files, nor did it operate any BitTorrent trackers for long. It offered the ".torrent" meta files which would tell a BitTorrent client where it could find the BitTorrent tracker. As well as the torrent files themselves, there was a set of Internet forums for visitors, where people talked about various subjects, and requested different files that they'd like to see people upload.

Suprnova's popularity inspired copycat sites at Suprnova.com and Suprnova.net. These had the same layout as Suprnova.org but requested a usage fee while Suprnova.org did not.

For a brief time in 2004, and again in 2007 Suprnova partnered with an amateur internet-base radio station, Suprnova Radio.

On 19 December 2004, a message was displayed on Suprnova's front page stating it had officially closed down. Some speculated it was due to its poor server and constant downtime, but others noted that Suprnova had been receiving legal warnings. Later, Slonček revealed on Suprnova's IRC channel that he and the other administrators were not willing to continue fighting the legal warnings which they had received. The Suprnova page reappeared encouraging visitors to visit the eXeem project webpage. Other reasons for closure were posted by LivingWithTrolls at slyck.com:

The host of the servers advised Slonček that he should close nova and live to fight another day with Exeem, either that or face the servers being withdrawn by said host and it closing anyway. The host was not going to allow any linking to his other affairs (several other P2P associations) which would cause more casualties. Slonček decided to close nova (he didn't have much choice) and focus on Exeem.

=== eXeem spinoff ===
The admin and founder of Suprnova.org, "Slonček" along with Supermedo (Andrej's brother Marko, who took the name of the cartoon hero "Superted" in Slovenian), founded "Swarm Systems Inc" in order to avoid legal repercussions. The program was developed by Arvid Norberg the writer of libtorrent with help from libtorrent contributor Daniel Wallin on Slonček's request and hosted at exeem.com.

This was initially the subject of much debate and excitement on the internet as the eXeem beta testing forums were hosted at the Suprnova Forums (which consisted of over 250,000 users), but upon its release turned out to be a disappointment — eXeem contained the Cydoor adware, like software such as Kazaa, and escaping this adware was one of the reasons that many users joined Suprnova in the first place. A hacked version of the program, eXeem Lite, was released afterward, and upon realising the effect of this program, the adware was eventually removed from eXeem. This was not enough to save the program's tarnished reputation, and the eXeem network shut down at the end of 2005.

== Reincarnations ==
The original Suprnova.org was reincarnated on newnova.org using a slightly modified version of the Suprnova.org codebase.

In early 2005, Mininova was created as an alternative to the dying Suprnova.

On 2 August 2007, TorrentFreak announced that Suprnova's former owner had donated the domain to The Pirate Bay, which had plans to relaunch the site. The new site was said to have the old design of Suprnova but possibly have some technical updates. Suprnova went online on 21 August 2007, at 18:03:27 GMT after the website displayed a countdown timer for 20 hours prior to its relaunch.

As of July 2016, it has been repurposed into a site that serves infographics.

== See also ==
- BitTorrent
- Copyright
- Anti-copyright
- Demonoid
