= Andrej Preston =

Slovenian Internet personality

Andrej Preston (born c. 1986), also known under the pseudonym Slonček (meaning "little elephant" in Slovene), is the founder of the former BitTorrent site Suprnova.org.

The Slovenian publication Mladina revealed in November 2004 that he was 18 years old and a student at the Waldorf High School in Ljubljana, Slovenia. After having shut down Suprnova.org in December 2004, he became the target of a police investigation in early 2005, and his two computers were confiscated. In October 2005, the prosecutor announced that no charges would be filed and the computers were returned.

Andrej Preston had given the domain name suprnova.org to The Pirate Bay. The Pirate Bay had relaunched it as of August 21, 2007.

On August 25, 2007, he moved to San Francisco, California, where he is visiting Academy of Art University.

Three years after donating the suprnova.org domain to The Pirate Bay, Preston retrieved it, in order to make a new website, which should become an online video portal.

Since 2011, he has produced videos for his United States–based YouTube channel The Infographics Show, where he discusses history and current events.
