= QBittorrent =

Free and open source BitTorrent client

qBittorrent

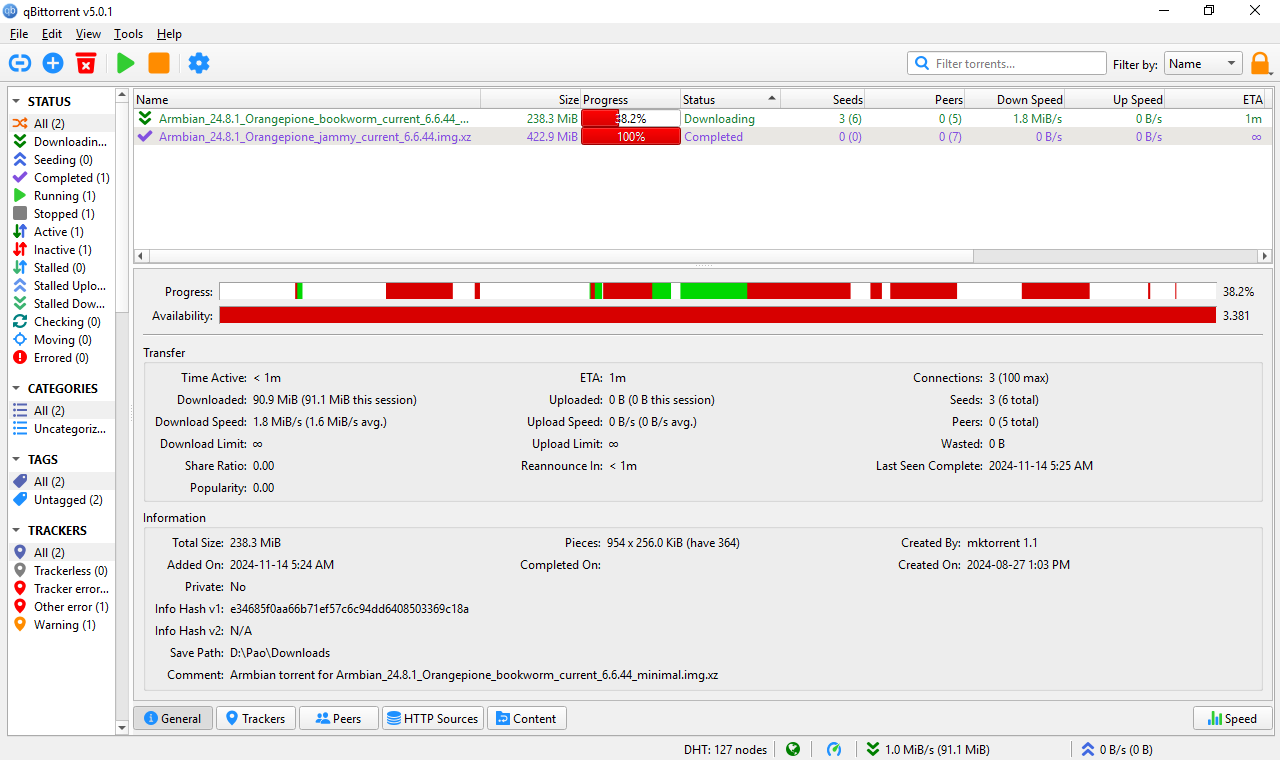
- A screenshot of qBittorrent v5.0.1 running on Windows 10
- Original author: Christophe Dumez
- Developers: Sledgehammer999, Chocobo1, glassez, pmzqla and others
- Release: May 16, 2006; 20 years ago
- Stable release: 5.2.2 / 16 June 2026; 10 days ago
- Written in: C++ (Qt), Python
- Operating system: Cross-platform: FreeBSD, Linux, macOS, OS/2, Windows
- Platform: ARM, x86, x64
- Available in: ≈70 languages
- List of languages Default UI: English ≥ 99% translated: Basque, Catalan, Chinese (Taiwan), Czech, Danish, Dutch, Galician, German, Hebrew, Indonesian, Japanese, Korean, Lithuanian, Polish, Portuguese (Brazil), Russian, Turkish, Ukrainian ≥ 50% translated: Belarusian, Bulgarian, Chinese, Chinese (Hong Kong), Finnish, French, Greek, Hungarian, Italian, Latvian (Latvia), Malay (Malaysia), Norwegian Bokmål, Occitan (post 1500), Portuguese, Romanian, Slovak, Slovenian, Spanish, Swedish ≥ 10% translated: Croatian, Esperanto, Arabic, Armenian, English (Australia), English (United Kingdom), Georgian, Hindi (India), Icelandic, Latgalian, Uzbek (Latin), Vietnamese
- Type: BitTorrent client
- License: GPLv3+ with OpenSSL linking exception
- Website: www.qbittorrent.org
- Repository: github.com/qbittorrent/qBittorrent

qBittorrent is a cross-platform free and open-source BitTorrent client written in native C++. It relies on Boost, OpenSSL, zlib, Qt 6 toolkit and the libtorrent-rasterbar library for the torrent back-end, with an optional search engine written in Python.

== History ==
qBittorrent was originally developed in March 2006 by Christophe Dumez. qBittorrent contained a remote code execution exploit caused by a failure to validate any TLS certificates presented to the application when downloading content via HTTP. The flaw, which had been in the application since at least 2010, was eventually fixed in version 5.0.1, on October 28, 2024, more than 14 years later. It is not believed the flaw affected downloads using the BitTorrent protocol, however the application uses HTTP(s) to check for updates, download RSS feeds and manage its Internet geolocation database.

== Features ==
qBittorrent is a cross-platform torrent client compatible with FreeBSD, Linux, macOS, OS/2 (including ArcaOS and eComStation), and Windows. Among its main features are bandwidth scheduling, torrent queuing and prioritization, content selection within torrents, and an integrated RSS feed reader with automatic download filters. The client supports DHT, PEX, encrypted connections, LPD, UPnP, NAT-PMP, μTP, magnet links, and private torrents, as well as IP filtering using eMule dat or PeerGuardian file formats. Version 4.6.0 added experimental I2P support.

qBittorrent also includes an integrated torrent search engine powered by user-installable Python plugins, enabling simultaneous searches across multiple torrent sites directly from the client. Remote control is available through a secure web user interface. The client supports IPv6, Unicode, and is available in approximately 70 languages. Sequential downloading, which enables approximate media streaming, and a torrent creation tool are also included.

== Reception ==
In 2012, Ghacks suggested qBittorrent as an alternative to μTorrent for those put off by its adware and bundleware changes. TechRadar reviewed the application in 2020, praising its ease of use, ad-free interface, and extensibility through plugins as features that make the software more capable for power users.

== See also ==
- Comparison of BitTorrent clients
- List of free and open-source software packages
- Usage share of BitTorrent clients
