= List of P2P protocols =

== File transfer protocols used by multiple programs ==
The name of the protocol may also be the name of the primary or original application software that uses it.

Protocol	Used by	Defunct clients
Advanced Peer-to-Peer Networking (APPN)	Systems Network Architecture	
BitTorrent	BitComet, Bitlord, BitTorrent, Flashget, FrostWire, Getright, i2psnark, libtorrent, μTorrent, Miro, MLDonkey, Popcorn Time, qBittorrent, Shareaza, Tixati, Transmission, Tribler, Xunlei, Vuze, etc.	Trustyfiles, Vagaa
DarkMX HTTPS over Tor Protocol	DarkMX	
Direct Connect	ApexDC++, BCDC++, DC++, MLDonkey, Shareaza	NeoModus Direct Connect
eDonkey	aMule, Bitcomet, eMule, Flashget, imule, MLDonkey, Neoloader, Shareaza, Xunlei	FileScope, edonkey2000, Vagaa
FastTrack	MLDonkey, XNap	Grokster, Kazaa, Kazaa Lite, Trustyfiles
Freenet	Freenet, Frost	
Fopnu Peer Networking Protocol	Fopnu	
Gnutella	Cabos, Envy, Gnucleus, gtk-gnutella, iphex, Phex, Shareaza, WireShare	Acquisition, BearShare, FileScope, iMesh, LimeWire, Morpheus, Trustyfiles
Gnutella2	Envy, gtk-gnutella, MLDonkey, Shareaza	FileScope
Libp2p	IPFS, Orbit (chat application), Ethereum	
OpenFT	giFT, MLDonkey	
OpenNap	Audiognome, Lopster, SunshineUN, TekNap, Utatane, XNap, Winlop, WinMX	FileScope, Morpheus, Napigator
Overnet	XNap	edonkey2000, Overnet
RetroShare	RetroShare, elRepo.io, Xeres	UnseenP2P
Soulseek	Nicotine+, Seeker, slskd, Soulseek NS, SoulseekQt	GoSeek, iSoul, MewSeek, Museek, Museek+, Nicotine, PySoulSeek, SolarSeek, Soulseex (ssX)
Tox	qTox, μTox, Toxic, Toxygen, TRIfA, Antox, Isotoxin, jTox, Protox, aTox	
WebTorrent	WebTorrent Desktop, Brave (web browser)	
WinMX Peer Networking Protocol	OurMX, WinMX, WinPY	
WebRTC	PeerTube	

== File transfer protocols used by only one application ==
Program
Filetopia
Perfect Dark
Share
Soribada
Winny

== Chat protocols used by multiple programs ==
Protocol	Used by	Defunct clients
IRC (XDCC)	BitchX, Colloquy, Konversation, KVIrc, mIRC, Pidgin, WeeChat, HexChat	
Tox	qTox, μTox, Toxic, Toxygen, TRIfA, Antox, Isotoxin, jTox, Protox, aTox	

== Bitcoin ==
Protocol	Used by	Defunct clients
Bitcoin	Bitcoin, Alt-Coins	

== See also ==
- Comparison of file-sharing applications
