= Comparison of file-sharing applications =

File sharing is a method of distributing electronically stored information such as computer programs and digital media. This article contains a list and comparison of file sharing applications; most of them make use of peer-to-peer file sharing technologies.

This comparison also contains download managers that can be used as file sharing applications. For solely download managers, see the comparison of download managers; for BitTorrent-only clients, see the comparison of BitTorrent clients.

== Table ==
Name	Network	Anonymous P2P	Link system compatibility	Price	Platform	License	Programming language	No Malware	Latest release year	Extra information
aMule	eDonkey, Kad	No	eD2k, magnet	Free	GNU, macOS, Windows, Linux	GPL	C++	Yes	2016, 2.3.3 (February 7, 2021; 5 years ago) [±]	
BitComet	BitTorrent, eDonkey, Kad; HTTP/FTP download	No	ed2k, magnet	Free	Windows	Proprietary	C++	Yes	2015, 1.94 (September 11, 2022; 3 years ago) [±]	Exploits SuperSeeding and thus is often banned by trackers and peers. Compatible with e2DK links through an eMule plugin which gives access to eDonkey and Kad networks and cross-network sharing abilities with BitTorrent network.
DC++	Direct Connect	No	magnet	Free	Windows	GPL	C++	Yes	2017, 0.866 May 20, 2017; 9 years ago	Many modifications exist, for example: LinuxDC++, EiskaltDC++, FlylinkDC++, etc.
eMule	eDonkey, Kad	No	ed2k	Free	Windows	GPL	C++	Yes	2010,	Supports protocol obfuscation
Filetopia	Filetopia	No (except when using a bouncer)	No	Free	Windows	Proprietary	Java	No	2018	
Flashget	BitTorrent, eDonkey; HTTP/FTP download	No	?	?	Windows	Proprietary	?	?	2012	
Free Download Manager	BitTorrent; HTTP/FTP download	No	metalink	Free	Windows	Proprietary	C++	Yes	2015, 6.13.4.3616 (February 9, 2021; 5 years ago) [±]	
Freenet’s FProxy	Freenet	Yes	No	Free	GNU, macOS, Windows	GPL	Java	Yes	2020, 0.7.5 (Build 1506) (February 16, 2026; 3 months ago) [±]	
Frost	Freenet	Yes	No	Free	GNU, macOS, Windows	GPL	Java	Yes	2011	
FrostWire	BitTorrent	No	magnet	Free	GNU, macOS, Windows	GPL	Java	Yes	2015, 6.9.8 (build 312) (April 26, 2022; 4 years ago) [±]	Fork of LimeWire, with no copyrighted-material blocker planned.
Fopnu	Fopnu	No	No	Free	GNU Linux, Windows	Proprietary	C++	No	2023	Fully decentralized network
GetRight	BitTorrent; HTTP/FTP download	No	?	?	Windows	?	?	?	2011	
giFT	OpenFT and, with plugins, Ares, Gnutella, FastTrack	No	No	Free	GNU, macOS, Windows	GPL	C	Yes	2004, 0.11.8.1 (2004-11-27) [±]	
GnucDNA / Gnucleus	Gnutella, Gnutella2	No	No	Free	Windows	GPL	C++	Yes	2005, 2.2.0.0 (June 17, 2005; 20 years ago) [±]	
GNUnet / gnunet-fs	GNUnet	Yes	ECRS	Free	GNU, FreeBSD, macOS, Windows	GNU AGPLv3 or later (Free software)	C	Yes	2019, 0.27 (March 19, 2026; 2 months ago) [±]	Latest preview release: 0.11.0pre66 / June 6, 2018; 7 years ago
gtk-gnutella	Gnutella	No	magnet	Free	GNU, Windows, Linux	GPL	C	Yes	2018, 1.3.1 (March 9, 2026; 2 months ago) [±]	
I2Phex	I2P (protocol Gnutella)	Yes	magnet	Free	GNU, macOS, Windows	GPL	Java	Yes	2011	Need I2P to run.
iMule	I2P (protocol Kad network)	Yes	ed2k, magnet	Free	GNU, macOS, Windows	GPL	C++	Yes	2013, 2.3.3.3 (June 1, 2016) [±]	needs I2P to run
Jumpshare	Jumpshare	No	No	Free or US$9.99/month	Windows, macOS	Proprietary	Various	Yes	2015	Real-time file sharing with built-in utilities for screenshots, screencasts, notes, and voice clips
KCeasy	Ares, Gnutella, FastTrack, OpenFT	No	No	Free	Windows	GPL	C++, Object Pascal (Delphi)	Yes	2008	Uses integrated giFT file sharing daemon as back-end.
KGet	BitTorrent; HTTP/FTP download	No	?	Free	part of KDE on Windows	GPL	C++	Yes	2012	?
MLDonkey	BitTorrent, eDonkey, FastTrack, (Gnutella, Gnutella2), Kad; HTTP/FTP download	No	ed2k, magnet, sig2dat	Free	GNU, macOS, Windows, Linux	GPL	OCaml	Yes	2014, 3.2.1 (August 20, 2024; 21 months ago) [±]	P2P application, telnet / web-interface / GUI interface, complete and complex remote usage. Sancho GUI makes automatic SSH tunnels.
Nodezilla	Private	Yes	No	Free	GNU, Windows	core proprietary, GUI GPL	Java	Yes	2010	Most is proprietary, GUI is GPL.
Perfect Dark	Perfect Dark	Yes	No	Free	Windows	Proprietary	C++	Yes	2015	Boards. Auto update.
Retroshare	Retroshare	Yes	Own format	Free	Windows, GNU, macOS	GPL	C++	Yes	2023	Uses PGP for friend authentication. Decentralized F2F network type.
Robert	I2P (protocol BitTorrent)	Yes	magnet	Free	GNU, macOS, Windows	GPL	Python	Yes	2012	needs I2P to run
Share	Share	Yes	No	Free	Windows	Proprietary	Object Pascal (Delphi)	Yes	2006	Anonymous developer; tries to be Winny successor
Shareaza	eDonkey, BitTorrent, Gnutella, Gnutella2, Direct Connect; HTTP/FTP download	No	ed2k, magnet, Piolet/MP2P, gnutella	Free	Windows	GPL	C++	Yes	2017, 2.7.10.2 (September 18, 2017; 8 years ago) [±]	Uses a powerful files library; maintained by volunteer group
StealthNet	RShare	Yes	No	Free	GNU, macOS, Windows	GPL	C#	Yes	2011	Evolution of the RShare client with many functions.
Soulseek	Soulseek	No	No	Free, donations for privileges	Windows, Mac, Linux	Proprietary	C++, QT	Yes	2015, SoulseekQt build 2024.02.01 (February 1, 2024; 2 years ago) [±]	Folder downloads, browse users with folder trees, no multi-source downloads
Tribler	BitTorrent and Tribler	Yes	magnet	Free	Windows, GNU, macOS	GNU LGPL v2.1+	Python, C++	Yes	2019, 7.12.1 (September 20, 2022; 3 years ago) [±]	Unlike most other torrent clients, Tribler is decentralized (as well as anonymous) and does not rely on any trackers or any other indexing service to discover content. Also features a built-in video streamer.
Vuze (formerly Azureus)	BitTorrent and I2P	No (except when using I2P)	magnet	Free	GNU, macOS, Windows	GPL	Java	No	2016, 5.7.6.0 (November 2, 2017; 8 years ago) [±]	
WinMX	WinMX Peer Network (independent, now user-operated), OpenNAP, chatrooms supported	No	No	Free	Windows	Proprietary	C++	Yes	2004	Official development has ceased due to RIAA coercion. Versions 3.53, 3.54 beta 4 and older are available from 3rd parties.
Winny	Winny	Yes	No	Free	Windows	Proprietary	C++	Yes	2003	
WireShare	Gnutella, BitTorrent	No	magnet	Free	GNU, macOS, Windows	GPL	Java	Yes	2016	Forked from Limewire pro
Name	Network	Anonymous P2P	Link system compatibility	Price	Platform	License	Programming language	No Malware	Latest release year	Extra information

- Note that several applications have had adware or spyware tied in during the past and may have it again in the future. The same goes for forks of open source apps, e.g. eMule. This list attempts to display the current status only.
- No longer available from their websites: Acquisition, Audiogalaxy, Bearshare, Bitblinder, CuteMX, edonkey2000, Grokster, iMesh, Kazaa, Kazaa Lite, LimeWire, Manolito, Morpheus, Napster, Pando and Scour Exchange.
- Opera web browser no longer includes P2P functionality.

== See also ==
- File sharing in Canada
- List of file-sharing programs for Linux and BSD
- List of P2P protocols
- Open music model
- Timeline of file sharing

=== Other comparisons ===
- Comparison of Advanced Direct Connect software
- Comparison of BitTorrent clients
- Comparison of G2 software
- Comparison of gnutella software
- Comparison of download managers
- Comparison of file transfer protocols
