= List of file-sharing programs for Linux and BSD =

A list of file sharing programs for use on computers running Linux, BSD or other Unix-like operating systems, categorised according to the different filesharing networks or protocols they access.

== BitTorrent ==
- BitTorrent
- Deluge
- KTorrent
- Miro
- Opera
- Tixati
- Transmission
- Tribler - Tribler uses a modified form of the BitTorrent protocol; it is anonymous and decentralized (and so does not require a tracker or indexing service to discover content).
- Vuze

== Direct Connect & Advanced Direct Connect ==
- LinuxDC++

== eDonkey & Kad ==
- aMule
- EDonkey 2000 (inactive)
- MLDonkey

== GNUnet ==
- Gnunet

== Gnutella ==
- Phex
- gtk-gnutella
- Limewire

== IRC with DCC or XDCC ==
- HexChat

== Soulseek ==
- Nicotine Plus - external

== Multiple Filesharing Protocols/Networks ==
- Apollon (inactive): Ares, FastTrack, Gnutella, OpenFT
- FrostWire: BitTorrent, Gnutella
- giFT (inactive): Ares, FastTrack, Gnutella, OpenFT
- LimeWire: BitTorrent, Gnutella
- Lphant - external: BitTorrent, eDonkey, Kad
- MLdonkey: BitTorrent, DirectConnect, eDonkey, FastTrack, Kad, Overnet
