= Bitzi =

- Website type: Metadata
- Available in: English
- Founded: 2001; 25 years ago
- Dissolved: 2013
- Country of origin: USA
- Founders: Gordon Mohr, Mike Linksvayer
- Website: bitzi.com
- Launched: 2001; 25 years ago
- Current status: Defunct (2013)
- Content license: CC BY-SA 2.0

Bitzi was a website, operating from 2001 to 2013, where volunteers shared reports about any kind of digital file, with identifying metadata, commentary, and other ratings.

Information contributed and rated by volunteers was compiled into the Bitpedia data set and reference work, described by Bitzi as a "digital media encyclopedia". The Bitpedia was published through the Bitzi website and web services under an open content license (Creative Commons Attribution - Share Alike 2.0).

Bitzi's standards and services have been adopted by a number of popular peer-to-peer file sharing systems. Bitzi was sponsored by a metadata publishing company of the same name based in San Francisco.

== History ==
Founded by Gordon Mohr with Mike Linksvayer, the Bitzi service launched in 2001.

The Bitzi website shut down on 31 December 2013.

== Technology ==
At Bitzi, files were identified by applying a strong hash function to their contents, which gives a distinct "fingerprint" for each file. Bitzi named the combination of standard hash functions used by its system "bitprints." An open source downloadable tool, the Bitcollider, calculates file hashes and extracts intrinsic metadata from common media file types to assist user contributions.

Bitzi cross-referenced multiple Uniform Resource Identifiers (URIs) for files, primarily URIs used by peer-to-peer file-sharing networks and/or clients:

- sha1:/magnet: (Gnutella)
- kzhash: (Grokster)
- tree:tiger: (DC++, Shareaza).
- ed2k: (eDonkey2000, eMule, OverNet)

Other file-specific metadata was also collected, such as file size, alternate filenames, audio/video encoding details, user ratings, and free-form comments or descriptions. Users could displace flawed information with new contributions.

Data about specific files can also be programmatically retrieved via a REST-style XML Web Services.

== Relationship to peer-to-peer networks ==
Bitzi originated several popular standards in the peer-to-peer file sharing sphere, including the Magnet URI scheme and Tiger tree hashes.

Many peer-to-peer file sharing programs, including LimeWire/Frostwire, older Bearshare versions, and older Shareaza versions, offered an option to look up local files or network search results at Bitzi for more information about their contents or quality.

As peer-to-peer file sharing networks often have mislabeled or corrupt files, Bitzi can sometimes provide additional confidence that a file is as expected, before a user begins a long download. In such a role, Bitzi served to ameliorate some common attacks on peer-to-peer networks.
