= List of historical Gnutella clients =

Many projects have attempted to use the Gnutella network, since its introduction in early 2000. This list enumerates abandoned or discontinued projects.

== List of discontinued clients ==
Name	Platform	Last Release	License
CocoGnut	RISC OS	June 28, 2005	Freeware
Gnotella	Windows	before March 2002	Freeware
Mactella	Macintosh	December 7, 2001	Freeware
MLDonkey	Cross-platform	July 27, 2007	GNU GPL
Mutella	Unix	August 26, 2004	GPL
Newtella	Windows	December 18, 2000	Freeware
PEERanha	Windows	April 12, 2002	Unknown
Qtella	Unix-like	May 27, 2004	GNU GPL
SwapNut	Windows	Unknown	Unknown
Swapper	Windows	Temporary due to litigation	Proprietary
ToadNode	Windows	October 1, 2002	Freeware
XoloX	Windows	April 21, 2003	Proprietary
XNap	Java	July 14, 2004	GNU GPL

== List of former gnutella clients ==
Software that still work but dropped the GNUtella protocol.

Name	Platform	Last Release	License
FrostWire (since version 5 uses only BitTorrents)	Java	6 (2015-02-18)	GNU GPL
MP3 Rocket (since 2011 is only a YouTube downloader)	Java	7.3 (2015-03-02)	GNU GPL
iMesh (since version 6 dropped GNUtella)	Windows	2012	Proprietary

== Additional information ==
=== Mutella ===
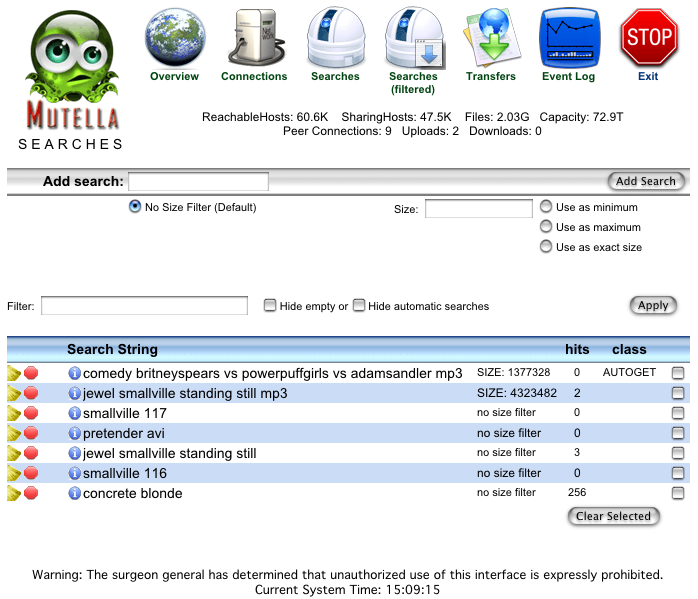
Mutella version 0.3.9b remote control web gui showing search progress.

- Developers - Max Zaitsev, Gregory Block
- Operating system - UNIX
- Latest release version - 0.4.5
- Genre - peer-to-peer
- License - GPL
- Website - Mutella development site

Mutella was a Gnutella client developed by Max Zaitsev and Gregory Block. It had two user interfaces, one for textmode use and another called remote control, which ran on an integrated web server and was used by a web browser. The first public version of Mutella was published on October 6, 2001.

The Mutella logo was changed into a squid somewhere around version 4.1. Before this change the logo used to be an Ouroboros. There was a blue and a black version of the ouroboros logo.

=== SwapNut ===
Slashdot reports that LimeWire and SwapNut used the same code. The website was www.swapnut.com.

=== XoloX ===
XoloX /ˈzoʊlɒks/ was a Gnutella-based peer-to-peer file sharing application for Windows. It advertised having no spyware, adware, or hijackware. However, upon installation, it prompted the user to install programs suspected to be of that kind. Also, Microsoft Anti-Spyware (later Microsoft Defender Antivirus) detected adware programs when you started to install the program.

==== XoloX links ====
- www.xolox.nl was the Official Website. Dead since June 2007.
- Review: Xolox

== See also ==
- Abandonware
- Comparison of Gnutella software
