= GiFT =

Former computer software daemon

giFT
- Developer: jasta
- Release: 2003; 23 years ago
- Stable release: 0.11.8.1 / 27 November 2004
- Preview release: No [±]
- Written in: C
- Platform: Cross-platform
- Available in: English
- Type: Peer-to-peer
- License: GNU GPL
- Website: sourceforge.net/projects/gift/

giFT Internet File Transfer (giFT) is a computer software daemon that allows several file sharing protocols to be used with a simple client having a graphical user interface (GUI). The client dynamically loads plugins implementing the protocols, as they are required.

== General ==
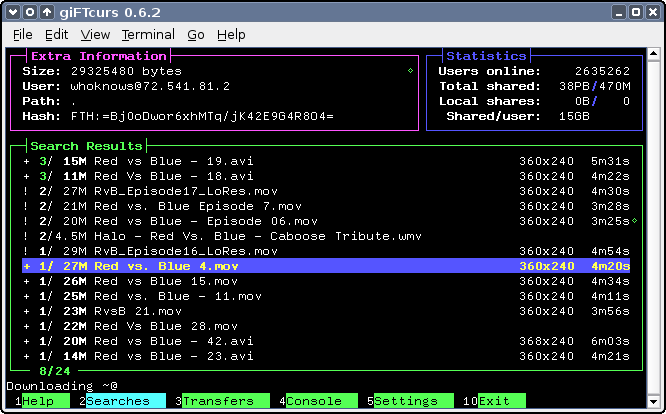
giFTcurs, a terminal front end for the giFT daemon

Clients implementing frontends for the giFT daemon communicate with its process using a lightweight network protocol. This allows the networking protocol code to be completely abstracted from the user interface. The giFT daemon is written using relatively cross-platform C code, which means that it can be compiled for and executed on a big variety of operating systems. There are several giFT GUI front-ends for Microsoft Windows, Apple Macintosh, and Unix-like operating systems.

The name giFT (giFT Internet File Transfer) is a so-called recursive acronym, which means that it refers to itself in the expression for which it stands.

One of the biggest drawbacks of the giFT engine is that it currently lacks Unicode support, which prevents sharing files with Unicode characters in their file names (such as "ø","ä", "å", "é" etc.). Also, giFT lacks many features needed to use the gnutella network effectively.

== Available plugins ==
Available protocols are:

Stable

- OpenFT, giFT's own file sharing protocol
- gnutella (used by FrostWire, Shareaza)
- Turtle F2F

Beta version

- FastTrack (used by Kazaa). The giFT plugin is giFT-FastTrack.

Alpha version

- OpenNap
- eDonkey network
- Soulseek

== OpenFT protocol ==
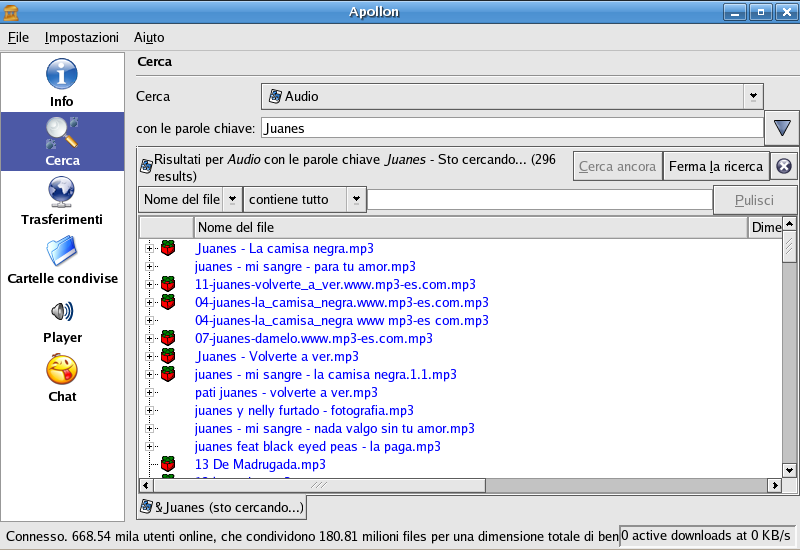
The Apollon front end

giFT's sibling project is OpenFT, a peer-to-peer file-sharing network protocol that has a structure in which nodes are divided into 'search' nodes and 'index' supernodes in addition to common nodes. Since both projects are related very closely, when one says 'OpenFT', one can mean either one of two different things: the OpenFT protocol, or the implementation in the form of a plugin for giFT.

Although the name OpenFT stands for "Open FastTrack", the OpenFT protocol is an entirely new protocol design: only a few ideas in the OpenFT protocol are drawn from what little was known about the FastTrack protocol at the time OpenFT was designed.

=== OpenFT file-sharing protocol ===
Like FastTrack and Napster, OpenFT is a network where nodes submit lists of shared files to other nodes to keep track of which files are available on the network. This reduces the bandwidth consumed from search requests at the price of additional memory and processing power on the nodes that store that information. The transmission of shared lists is not fully recursive: a node will only transmit its list of shared files to a single search node randomly chosen as that node's "parent", and the list of those files will not be further transmitted to other nodes.

OpenFT is also similar to the gnutella network in that search requests are recursively forwarded in between the nodes that keep track of the shared files.

There are three different kinds of nodes on the OpenFT network:

USER
Most nodes are USER nodes; these have no special function.
SEARCH
These nodes handle search requests; they search the filelists their CHILD nodes (explained below) submit to them. These nodes must have a capable Internet connection and at least 128M RAM. A modern processor is highly recommended as well.
INDEX
Nodes with fast connections and much memory can be INDEX nodes, which keep lists of available search nodes, collect statistics, and try to maintain the structure of the network.

A node can be both a SEARCH and an INDEX node. USER nodes will pick three SEARCH nodes to be their PARENT nodes. They will submit their shares list to them if the PARENT accepts the USER as its CHILD. By default, SEARCH nodes will be PARENTS for a maximum of 500 CHILD nodes.

== giFT front-ends ==
Name	Platform	License	Features	Latest version	Website
giFTcurs	Unix-like	GPL	Ncurses-based; the only one that was officially supported	0.6.2	
Apollon	Unix-like/KDE	GPL	Tabbed searching; Preview of mp3 and videos; FirstRun wizard; System tray docking; Chat with other Apollon users	1.0.2.1 (2005-05-08)	apollon.sourceforge.net
KCeasy	Microsoft Windows	GPL	Includes a media player.; Originally, included the giFT-FastTrack plugin, to connect to Kazaa and Kazaa Lite. In Version 0.12 and later he removed the giFT-FastTrack plug-in in order to avoid a legal fight with Sharman Networks. The FastTrack plug-in is still being developed and is available from a third-party website. Upgrading from previous versions of the program will not remove the giFT-FastTrack plug-in.	0.19-rc1 (2008-02-03)	KCeasy Source Forge website
giFTwin32	Microsoft Windows		fewer features than KCeasy, but also has a smaller footprint; better suited for older hardware		
Poisoned	Mac OS X	GPL	Its name is a pun on the German word Gift (which means poison in English).	0.5191 (2006-08-08)	www.gottsilla.net

== See also ==
- MLDonkey - another plugin based multi-network P2P client
