= Query flooding =

Search method on a peer-to-peer network

Query flooding is a method to search for a resource on a peer-to-peer network. It is simple and scales very poorly and thus is rarely used. Early versions of the Gnutella protocol operated by query flooding; newer versions use more efficient search algorithms.

== Operation ==
A peer-to-peer network generally consists of a large number of nodes, each connected to a small subset of the nodes and not all nodes in the network. If a node wants to find a resource on the network, which may be on a node it does not know about, it could simply broadcast its search query to its immediate neighbours. If the neighbours do not have the resource, it then asks its neighbours to forward the query to their neighbours in turn. This is repeated until the resource is found or all the nodes have been contacted, or perhaps a network-imposed hop limit is reached.

Query flooding is simple to implement and is practical for small networks with few requests. It contacts all reachable nodes in the network and so can precisely determine whether a resource can be found in the network (Hyphanet, for example, only returns a probabilistic result).

On the other hand, every request may cause every node to be contacted. Each node might generate a small number of queries; however, each such query floods the network. Thus, a larger network would generate far more traffic per node than a smaller one, making it inherently unscalable. Additionally, because a node can flood the network simply by issuing a request for a nonexistent resource, it could be possible to launch a denial-of-service attack on the network.

== Alternatives ==
Version 0.6 of the Gnutella protocol mandates query routing. The query routing specification explains how the ideas of the original research are implemented. Other file-sharing networks, such as the Kad network, use distributed hash tables to index files and for keyword searches. BitTorrent creates individual overlay networks for sharing individual files (or archives). Searches are performed by other mechanisms, such as locating torrent files indexed on a website. A similar mechanism can be used on the Gnutella network with magnet links. For instance, Bitzi provides a web interface to search for magnet links.

Earlier P2P networks, such as Napster, used a centralized database to locate files. This does not have a scaling problem, but the central server is a single point of failure.

== See also ==
- Flooding algorithm
