= Agent.AWF =

Windows-platform based malware

AWF (or Agent.AWF) is a malicious Trojan downloader affecting the Microsoft Windows operating system.

== Methods of infection ==
This Trojan is considered obsolete, and there are no known variants in the wild.

=== Affected operating systems ===
The following operating systems are known to be affected.

- Windows XP
- Windows 2003
- Windows 2000
- Windows ME
- Windows 98
- Windows 95
- Windows NT

== Operation ==
Agent.AWF displays virus activity in that it replaces files on a user's computer with a copy of itself, and moves the original, legitimate file to a back sub-folder. It is known to attempt to terminate security software, and the Trojan downloads a backdoor onto the computer, allowing the attacker to further compromise the computer. It is also known to modify the Windows registry. Agent.AWF does not spread automatically: it needs an attacking user's intervention in order to reach the affected computer. The means of transmission used include, among others, floppy disks, CD-ROMs, emails with attached files, Internet downloads, FTP, IRC channels, peer-to-peer (P2P) file sharing networks, etc.

== Identification ==
During installation, the following files are created, and may be present on a compromised system.

- abc123.pid
- svcipa.exe
- nod32kui.exe
