= WireShare =

Peer to peer file sharing software

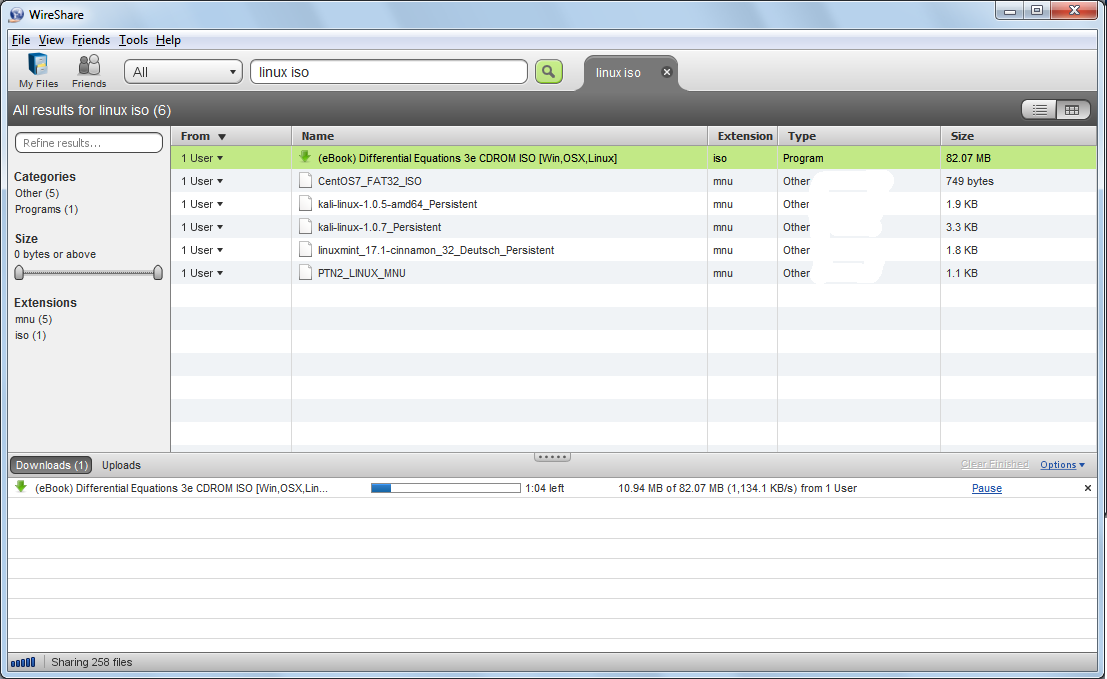
- Release: 28 October 2010; 16 years ago
- Written in: Java
- Platform: Cross-platform
- Type: Peer-to-peer file sharing
- License: GNU General Public License
- Website: sourceforge.net/projects/wireshare/
- Repository: https://sourceforge.net/projects/wireshare/

WireShare (formerly known as LimeWire Pirate Edition) is a revival of the LimeWire software, a gnutella p2p-network client. The original LimeWire Pirate Edition was adapted from LimeWire Basic edition to provide similar features to LimeWire Pro with no adware or backdoor control. The Ask toolbar integration was removed, along with dependencies on LimeWire servers and remote settings. The software supports Windows, Linux, and Mac, and its source code is available on GitHub.

== History ==
LimeWire Pirate Edition

After LimeWire was shut down by the RIAA, a hacker with the alias of "Meta Pirate" created LimeWire Pirate Edition. Lime Wire LLC has stated that the company was "not behind these efforts[, and] LimeWire does not authorize them. LimeWire, complying with the Court’s October 26, 2010 injunction, acted to shut down the Pirate Edition website." A court order was issued to close down the website and Meta Pirate did not contest the order.

WireShare

After it was shut down, the original LimeWire Pirate Edition open source project was reformed into WireShare with the goal of preserving the Gnutella network and maintaining a continuation of the original effort, with the software still operating today.

== See also ==
- FrostWire, a former Gnutella client, and also a LimeWire fork, that was created in 2004, also with the purpose of removing adware and backdoors.
