= Shareaza =

Peer-to-peer file sharing application

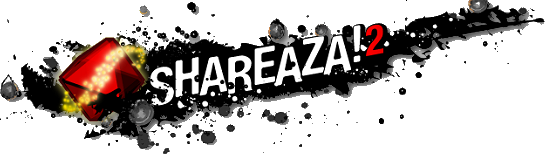

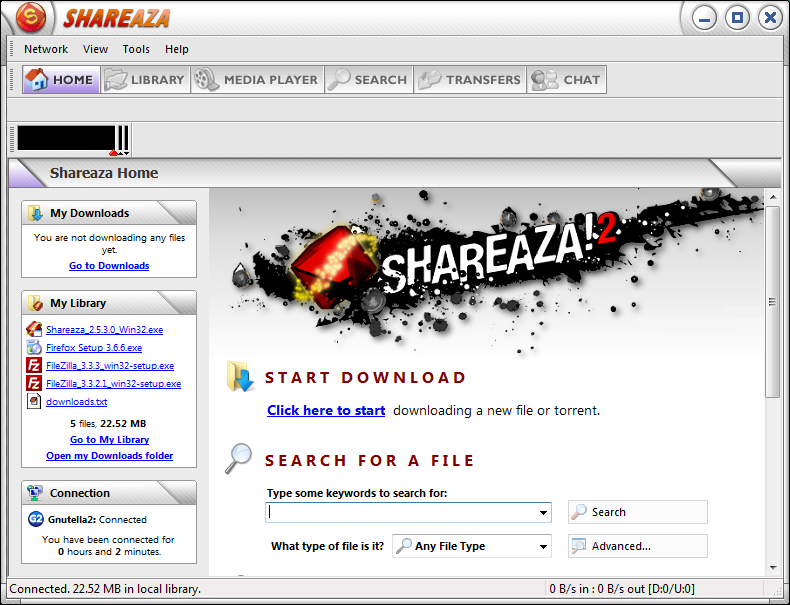
- Original author: Michael Stokes
- Release: 2002; 24 years ago
- Stable release: 2.7.10.2 / 18 September 2017; 8 years ago
- Preview release: None [±]
- Written in: C++ with MFC and Boost
- Operating system: Windows 2000 and later
- Size: 6.32 MB (32-bit), 6.82 MB (64-bit)
- Available in: 30 languages
- List of languages English, German, French, Spanish, Catalan, etc.
- Type: Peer-to-peer file sharing
- License: GPL-2.0-or-later
- Website: shareaza.sourceforge.net
- Repository: svn.code.sf.net/p/shareaza/code/

Shareaza is a peer-to-peer file sharing client running under Microsoft Windows which supports the Gnutella, Gnutella2 (G2), eDonkey, BitTorrent, FTP, HTTP and HTTPS network protocols and handles magnet links, ed2k links, and the now deprecated gnutella and Piolet links. It is available in 30 languages.

Shareaza was developed by Michael Stokes until June 1, 2004, and has since been maintained by a group of volunteers. On June 1, 2004, Shareaza 2.0 was released, along with the source code, under the GNU General Public License (GPL-2.0-or-later), making it free software.

== History ==
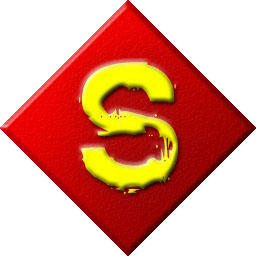
Logo of Shareaza version 1

In 2002 Stokes released the first version of a gnutella client he had written and dubbed "Shareaza". It was from the beginning a client with the aim of having features other gnutella clients did not have. Over the next two years Stokes coded in support for the eDonkey 2000 network, BitTorrent and a rewritten gnutella-based protocol which he named Gnutella2.

On June 1, 2004 Stokes released the Shareaza source code under the GPL-2.0-or-later license (which coincided with the release of Shareaza version 2.0). Shareaza joined LimeWire, Gnucleus, and others as an open-source client on the Gnutella network.

Since the beginning Shareaza was advertised as "completely free. No ads, no spyware, no guilting you to upgrade to a commercial version", stating that the developers "[couldn't] stand that kind of crap." It has remained as such in each subsequent release.

From the first version Shareaza has supported swarming, metadata, library management, and automatic file hashing.

=== Domain takeover ===
On 19 December 2007 the project's domain name, shareaza.com, was redirected to a site claiming to be "The Official Home of Shareaza", promoting the download of a client known as Shareaza V4 (which had become V6 in October 2009, V7 in August 2010, and V8 in November 2011) unrelated to releases by the Shareaza development team, an iMesh clone with only small graphical modifications, and using Shareaza v1 logo. The domain owner Jon Nilson was forced to sell it as a part of a settlement with La Societe Des Producteurs De Phonogrammes En France. This client is a network interface for a centralised music shop by Discordia Ltd. and does not connect to any open P2P network such as Gnutella, G2, eDonkey or BitTorrent. Content is limited to the DRM-protected music that can be bought in Discordia's online music store; Discordia is a company based in Cyprus, closely related to the RIAA and unrelated to the Shareaza development team. In response the Shareaza development team moved their website to SourceForge.

Versions prior to 2.3.1.0 of the original Shareaza connected to www.shareaza.com to check for software updates. From 1 January 2008 the new owner of the domain shareaza.com, Discordia Ltd. used this update check mechanism to suggest to users that ShareazaV4 (and later ShareazaV5, V6, and V7) was an update to the original Shareaza client. Since version 2.3.1.0, released on 3 January 2008, the original Shareaza has linked to the Shareaza pages at sourceforge.net.

=== Trademark registration by iMesh ===
On January 10, 2008, the new owners of Shareaza.com, Discordia Ltd (iMesh Inc.), filed for trademark registration of the Shareaza name in an attempt to stop the original developers from using the name, claiming that the first-ever use was on December 17, 2007. The Shareaza Development Team obtained legal representation to challenge the registration and a legal defense fund was set up. The development team appointed William Erwin to handle the donations; it was stated that he had been paid by iMesh to sabotage the defense, and that he had stolen the money donated. The trademark was awarded to iMesh after the development team had given up defending the trademark.

=== Version history ===
Release notes for all versions from 2.0.0.0 are linked from the Sharaza ChangeLog page.

v2.3.1.0
Version 2.3.1.0 is the last stable version of Shareaza that supports Windows 9x. It followed 2 days after the new owners of the project domain exploited the updating mechanism to emit a false update message to trick users into installing their fake Shareaza V4 client and contained a fix for this issue.

v2.4.0.0
Version 2.4.0.0 of Shareaza was released on October 1, 2008, with many bug fixes and major changes to provide better stability of the client. It was the first stable release to include IRC support. Furthermore, major changes to the torrent handling mechanism were made and Windows 98/Me support was discontinued (the last version working on Windows 9x is 2.3.1.0).

When v2.4 was released the roadmap for the next version (2.4.1.0, a v2.5 release candidate) was set for release around October 1, 2009, to be followed by 2.5.0.0 a month later.

v2.5.x.0
Version 2.5.0.0 of Shareaza was released on October 31, 2009. It was significantly more stable and less resource-consuming than earlier versions, and further improved BitTorrent support, such as by selective downloading of files contained in batch torrents and download prioritization. There were also updates to the Gnutella and eD2k implementation, such as extended support for GGEP, large files and chat. The IRC implementation of v2.4.0.0 was reworked to free it of the bugs that made it partially unusable in the previous version. Download manager capabilities were extended, Internet Explorer integration added, and BugTrap included to speed up and simplify reporting crashes.

Version 2.5.1.0 of Shareaza was released on December 1, 2009. It was significantly more stable and more functional than its predecessor due to fixed bugs. It improved usability and compatibility of BitTorrent according to most popular service suggestions. It made use of and required the SSE instruction set, and thus required at least a Pentium-III or an Athlon-XP processor.

Version 2.5.2.0 of Shareaza was released on February 6, 2010. It brought further improvements on stability. This and later versions were available optionally either as an SSE or non-SSE build to allow the use of older processors, unlike the SSE-only version 2.5.1.0. For this and later releases the SSE-optimized build uses SSE2 and requires at least a Pentium 4 or AMD Athlon 64.

Shareaza v2.5.3.0, released on June 13, 2010, focused on internal changes and optimizations; the only significant addition was a scheduler that allows full control over what the application does at a given time while running unattended.

Shareaza v2.5.4.0, released on February 12, 2011, improved UPnP support and added limited DC++ support. μTorrent-compatible peer exchange and tracker exchange for BitTorrent were also added. It fixed remaining IRC chat bugs and a lot of rather uncommon/rarely seen crashes.

Shareaza v2.5.5.0, released on May 29, 2011, further improved UPnP support and included DC++ and Gnutella updates, enhanced anti-spam protection during searches, and multi-file download merging.

V2.6.0.0

V2.6.0.0 was released on 3 June 2012, adding support for BitTorrent (Mainline) DHT and UDP trackers as well as containing interface optimizations for Windows 7.

V2.7.x.x

Shareaza 2.7.0.0 was made available on 31 August 2013, with a great many bugfixes. It contained major improvements to the BitTorrent support, eDonkey uploading and the built-in media player. It was followed by further V2.7.x.x releases.

== Awards and reviews ==
- In November 2008, Shareaza was SourceForge Project of the Month.
- In December 2009 Shareaza was ranked number 5 in SourceForge.Net's "What's Hot for Windows?" file sharing software ranking with 78% "recommended" (while number 1 was 81% "recommended"). As of 24 August 2010 it was in the same position. The ranking is based on user recommendations and opinions and downloads of software from project site.

== See also ==
- Comparison of file-sharing applications
- Comparison of download managers
