= Zultrax =

- Developer: Zultrax V.O.F.
- Stable release: 4.33 / April 2009
- Operating system: Windows
- Type: File sharing
- License: Proprietary
- Website: No longer on-line

Zultrax was a multi-network peer-to-peer application. Supported networks are ZEPP and gnutella. Zultrax runs under the Microsoft Windows operating system.

Zultrax was originally developed in 2001 by Peter Bartholomeus. It is coded using Borland Delphi. Development and support stopped in 2009.

The aim of Zultrax was to provide ease of use combined with the encrypted ZEPP network. This network was fully concentrated around the concepts of swarming and privacy protection.
