= UUHash =

Hash algorithm on the FastTrack network

UUHash is a hash algorithm employed by clients on the FastTrack network. It is employed for its ability to hash very large files in a very short period of time, even on older computers. However, this is achieved by only hashing a fraction of the file. This weakness makes it trivial to create a hash collision, allowing large sections to be completely altered without altering the checksum.

This method is used by Kazaa. The weakness of UUHash is exploited by anti-p2p agencies to corrupt downloads.

== How it works ==
The UUHash is a 160-bit string that is usually Base64-encoded for presentation. It is a concatenation of an MD5 hash and a CRC-32 sum of selected chunks of the file.

The first 307,200 bytes (300 Kibibyte, one "chunk size") of the file are MD5-hashed (less if the file is shorter). The 32 bit little endian integer value smallhash is initialized to 0.

If the file is strictly larger than one chunk size, a series of chunks at file offsets of 2^{n} MiB (n ≥ 0) and one chunk right at the end of the file are hashed using a CRC-32 (polynomial 0xEDB88320 reversed, 0x04C11DB7 normal). The last chunk of the power-of-two series ends strictly more than one chunk size before the end of the file, i.e. there is always at least one unread byte between the last two chunks (if there are that many chunks). (Note: BitCollider/0.4.0 implemented this unfaithfully) The end-of-file chunk may be shorter than one chunk size; it starts at or after one chunk size into the file. The CRC is initialized using smallhash and stored into smallhash.

So, for example:

offset 0 MiB, 300 KiB hashed with MD5
offset 1 MiB, 300 KiB hashed with CRC-32
offset 2 MiB, 300 KiB hashed...
offset 4 MiB, 300 KiB hashed...
offset 8 MiB, 300 KiB hashed...
...
last 300 KiB of file hashed with CRC-32

Finally, the bitwise complement of smallhash (still zero for files up to 300 KiB) is XORed together with the file size in bytes. The 160-bit UUHash is now the concatenation of the 128-bit MD5 hash and the final 32-bit smallhash value.

=== Test Vectors ===
Given below are hashes (base64 and hex) for strings of various lengths containing only 0x00 or 0xFF bytes, generated by sig2dat.

Note here that all strings that have a complete MD5 chunk have the same 128-bit prefix because their first chunks are the same (either 0x00 or 0xFF). For files that have the same number of chunks the CRC part differs only because of the included file length (all chunks are identical, or this weren't the case). For files up to 300 KiB, the file length can be extracted from the last four bytes of the hash; smallhash is ~0.

Input	Base64	Hexadecimal
0 bytes	1B2M2Y8AsgTpgAmY7PhCfv////8=	D41D8CD98F00B204E9800998ECF8427E-FFFFFFFF
0x00, 1 byte	k7iFrf4NoInN9jSQT9Wfcf7///8=	93B885ADFE0DA089CDF634904FD59F71-FEFFFFFF
0xFF, 1 byte	AFlP1PQrpD/BygQnoFdilf7///8=	00594FD4F42BA43FC1CA0427A0576295-FEFFFFFF
0x00, 2 bytes	xBA/Ei0nZ3ydsUTK4TlKZv3///8=	C4103F122D27677C9DB144CAE1394A66-FDFFFFFF
0xFF, 2 bytes	qyoNKN5rd//dbHKv6tCZq/3///8=	AB2A0D28DE6B77FFDD6C72AFEAD099AB-FDFFFFFF
0x00, 307199 bytes (300 KiB - 1)	YK6+Fj6S4MGzEC9H9Bn3gQBQ+/8=	60AEBE163E92E0C1B3102F47F419F781-0050FBFF
0xFF, 307199 bytes (300 KiB - 1)	I+QujFtxa9pBOt5X6NMGsgBQ+/8=	23E42E8C5B716BDA413ADE57E8D306B2-0050FBFF
0x00, 307200 bytes (300 KiB)	kK7e2ZIs+JRup4WGNUk3JP9P+/8=	90AEDED9922CF8946EA7858635493724-FF4FFBFF
0xFF, 307200 bytes (300 KiB)	oBSYynx6vdDeUWtP5N4mAv9P+/8=	A01498CA7C7ABDD0DE516B4FE4DE2602-FF4FFBFF
0x00, 307201 bytes (300 KiB + 1)	kK7e2ZIs+JRup4WGNUk3JHOg+S0=	90AEDED9922CF8946EA7858635493724-73A0F92D
0xFF, 307201 bytes (300 KiB + 1)	oBSYynx6vdDeUWtP5N4mAv5P+wA=	A01498CA7C7ABDD0DE516B4FE4DE2602-FE4FFB00
0x00, 614399 bytes (600 KiB - 1)	kK7e2ZIs+JRup4WGNUk3JHCHqBQ=	90AEDED9922CF8946EA7858635493724-7087A814
0xFF, 614399 bytes (600 KiB - 1)	oBSYynx6vdDeUWtP5N4mAqgX6Xs=	A01498CA7C7ABDD0DE516B4FE4DE2602-A817E97B
0x00, 614400 bytes (600 KiB)	kK7e2ZIs+JRup4WGNUk3JGlfGn0=	90AEDED9922CF8946EA7858635493724-695F1A7D
0xFF, 614400 bytes (600 KiB)	oBSYynx6vdDeUWtP5N4mApKrf9g=	A01498CA7C7ABDD0DE516B4FE4DE2602-92AB7FD8
0x00, 614401 bytes (600 KiB + 1)	kK7e2ZIs+JRup4WGNUk3JGhfGn0=	90AEDED9922CF8946EA7858635493724-685F1A7D
0xFF, 614401 bytes (600 KiB + 1)	oBSYynx6vdDeUWtP5N4mApOrf9g=	A01498CA7C7ABDD0DE516B4FE4DE2602-93AB7FD8
0x00, 614402 bytes (600 KiB + 2)	kK7e2ZIs+JRup4WGNUk3JGtfGn0=	90AEDED9922CF8946EA7858635493724-6B5F1A7D
0xFF, 614402 bytes (600 KiB + 2)	oBSYynx6vdDeUWtP5N4mApCrf9g=	A01498CA7C7ABDD0DE516B4FE4DE2602-90AB7FD8
0x00, 16777216 bytes (16 MiB)	kK7e2ZIs+JRup4WGNUk3JN/b8qg=	90AEDED9922CF8946EA7858635493724-DFDBF2A8
0xFF, 16777216 bytes (16 MiB)	oBSYynx6vdDeUWtP5N4mAt0YF2Y=	A01498CA7C7ABDD0DE516B4FE4DE2602-DD181766
0x00, 17084416 bytes (16 MiB + 300 KiB)	kK7e2ZIs+JRup4WGNUk3JN9r9qg=	90AEDED9922CF8946EA7858635493724-DF6BF6A8
0xFF, 17084416 bytes (16 MiB + 300 KiB)	oBSYynx6vdDeUWtP5N4mAt2oE2Y=	A01498CA7C7ABDD0DE516B4FE4DE2602-DDA81366
0x00, 17084417 bytes (16 MiB + 300 KiB + 1)	kK7e2ZIs+JRup4WGNUk3JN5r9qg=	90AEDED9922CF8946EA7858635493724-DE6BF6A8
0xFF, 17084417 bytes (16 MiB + 300 KiB + 1)	oBSYynx6vdDeUWtP5N4mAtyoE2Y=	A01498CA7C7ABDD0DE516B4FE4DE2602-DCA81366
0x00, 17391616 bytes (16 MiB + 600 KiB)	kK7e2ZIs+JRup4WGNUk3JN+7+6g=	90AEDED9922CF8946EA7858635493724-DFBBFBA8
0xFF, 17391616 bytes (16 MiB + 600 KiB)	oBSYynx6vdDeUWtP5N4mAt14HmY=	A01498CA7C7ABDD0DE516B4FE4DE2602-DD781E66
0x00, 17391617 bytes (16 MiB + 600 KiB + 1)	kK7e2ZIs+JRup4WGNUk3JNzVMqw=	90AEDED9922CF8946EA7858635493724-DCD532AC
0xFF, 17391617 bytes (16 MiB + 600 KiB + 1)	oBSYynx6vdDeUWtP5N4mAgS1uWk=	A01498CA7C7ABDD0DE516B4FE4DE2602-04B5B969
0x00, 17391618 bytes (16 MiB + 600 KiB + 2)	kK7e2ZIs+JRup4WGNUk3JN/VMqw=	90AEDED9922CF8946EA7858635493724-DFD532AC
0xFF, 17391618 bytes (16 MiB + 600 KiB + 2)	oBSYynx6vdDeUWtP5N4mAge1uWk=	A01498CA7C7ABDD0DE516B4FE4DE2602-07B5B969

== Sig2Dat ==
The name UUHash derives from the sig2dat utility which creates URIs referencing files on Kazaa. These URIs are of the form:

sig2dat://|File: surprise.mp3|Length:5845871Bytes|UUHash:=1LDYkHDl65OprVz37xN1VSo9b00=

Not considering the fact that this URI format is not RFC compliant, UUHash refers to the Base64-encoding of the hash and not the hash itself.
