= Filetopia =

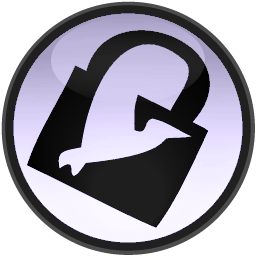

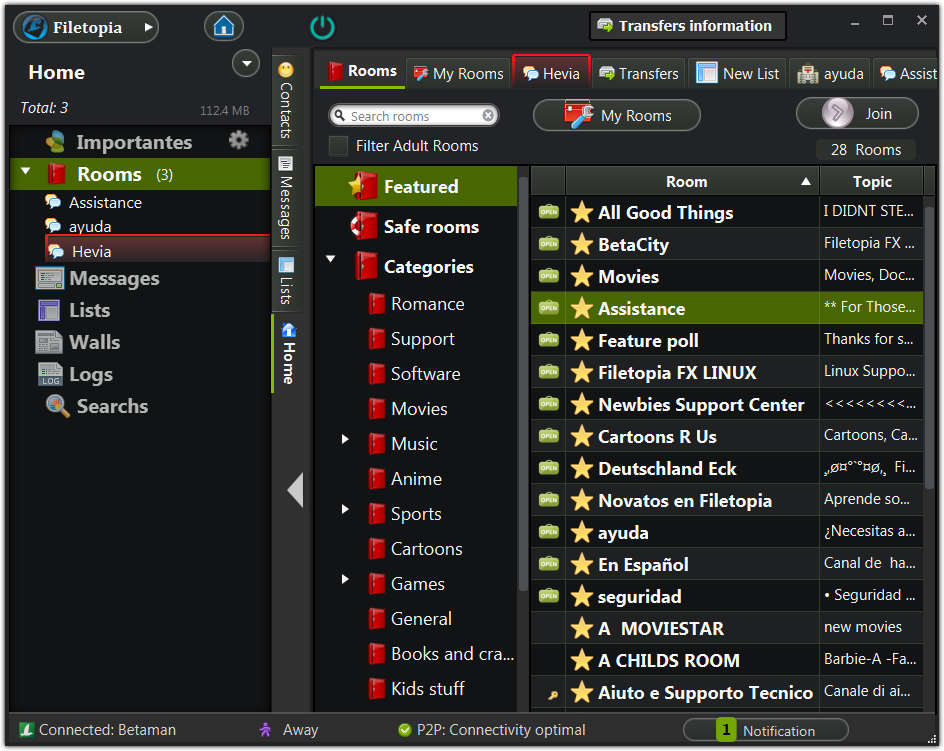
- Filetopia Room selection window screenshot
- Developer(s): Enrique Martin
- Initial release: March 1999
- Stable release: 877 / 19 March 2019
- Written in: JavaFX
- Size: 50 MB
- Available in: English, Spanish, Italian, German, Dutch, Arabic
- Type: File sharing, chat
- License: Freeware
- Website: filetopia.org

Filetopia is a free, multi-platform peer-to-peer file sharing client and networking tool that allows users to share files and send instant messages to others. Users can share files in public chat rooms or privately with contacts.

== History ==
Filetopia software development started in October 1998, and the first public beta was released in March 1999. The classic Filetopia software version was 3.04d, 2002. In 2003, Filetopia v3.04 was reviewed in PC Magazine and rated 3/5. In 2004, the author of Filetopia was interviewed on the website Slyck.com.

In April 2012, development began on a project to completely rewrite the program in JavaFX. This version was eventually released as Filetopia FX.

=== Filetopia FX (from 2015) ===
Filetopia FX no longer allows global-wide file searching and instead encourages meeting new people. It is a complete rewrite of the original.

In this version, the maximum file size limit of 2 GB was removed; users gained the ability to post images and HTML fragments, which are filtered for security purposes; Room Walls have new features, such as comments, votes, and moderation; the ability to notify admins and subscribers was added; and the Log was given a search function.

Users could also host their own rooms, which are excluded from the main P2P network.

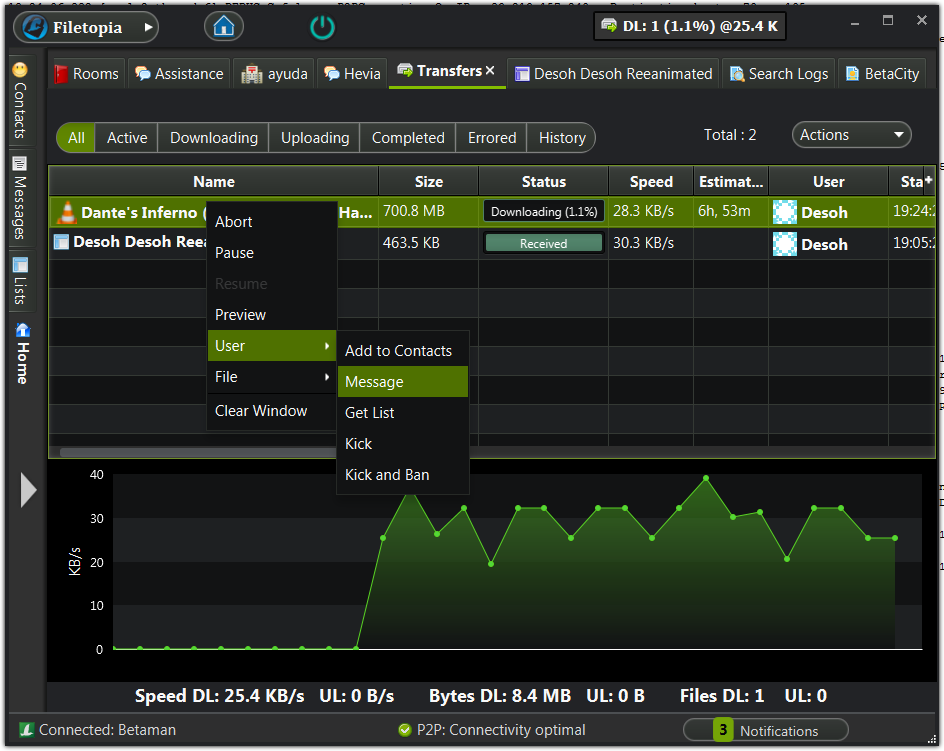
Transfers window in action with a graph

== See also ==
- Online community
- RetroShare (software with similar features)
