= Slyck.com =

Technology news website (defunct)

- Website type: News site with articles about P2P networking and file sharing
- Available in: English
- Owner: Tom Mennecke
- Creators: Tom Mennecke, Ray Hoffmann
- Website: Slyck.com
- Registration: Optional (to post on forum)
- Launched: 2000 (as Slyway); 2001 (renamed Slyck)
- Current status: Offline

Slyck was a website that produced and aggregated file sharing news stories, as well as offering a forum for users.

== History ==
Ray Hoffman began operating Slyck.com as Slyway.com in 2000, which initially was an aggregate news site with some original content, and contained guides to the most popular file-sharing resources at the time, whilst providing statistics of P2P file sharing networks, which included Napster, iMesh, Scour, Usenet and IRC. On the 10th of August 2001, Slyway was renamed Slyck.

== Impact ==
Due to the lack of mainstream news coverage on P2P topics, file sharing, and discussion of copyright legislation, Slyck had a significant impact as a news site: New Scientist cited Slyck as a "popular file sharing news site", Digital Audio Essentials (2004) referred to Slyck as "an excellent resource" for news and information on file sharing, and in Steal This Computer Book 4.0 (2006) the site was considered to be "up to date on the latest file sharing technology and news".

== Content ==
The website conducted interviews with file sharing software developers and intellectual property role players, maintaining statistics of P2P file sharing networks, and notably shed light on the developing conflict between file sharing users and intellectual property owners, which covered the legal battle against copyright and intellectual property infringement, such as the takedown of torrent websites like LokiTorrent and Suprnova.org, events that were covered in mainstream media from input by the intellectual property owners, which lacked the views of file sharing users which Slyck coverage aimed to represent. Notably, Slyck extensively covered BitTorrent website The Pirate Bay, and the efforts by Swedish and other national authorities to shut down and prosecute the founders and operators of The Pirate Bay. Slyck covered other news topics such as rollout of broadband Internet, new and emerging technologies, device hardware, and advances in computer networking.

Slyck news writers were able to interview notable individuals such as:

- Michael Weiss of StreamCast, Nir Arbel of SoulSeek, and Pablo Soto of Optisoft S.L and Kevin Hearn of WinMX were interviewed regarding their software and P2P networks.
- Jon Lech Johansen, nicknamed DVDJon, was interviewed, regarding the DeCSS software that allowed for DVD discs to be played on the Linux Operating System, and allowed for development of duplicating software for DVD discs.
- Muslix64, developer of BackupHDDVD, a software hacker who first circumvented the AACS protection scheme for HD DVD and Blu-ray discs, discussed his reasons for the circumvention of the Digital Rights Management software.
- Dean Garfield, then head of the MPAA's legal team, was interviewed by Nicholas Parr about the MPAA's legal campaign against movie piracy.

== Legal threat ==
In March 2010, Slyck was threatened with legal action by the controversial UK law firm ACS:Law for defamation, due to comments made by forum users on Slyck.com's UK file sharing Allegations/Lawsuit Discussion sub-forum. Nothing came of the threatened legal action.

== Current status ==
By June 2016 Slyck had ceased publishing new news articles, with the last file-sharing news article being posted on 16 June 2016.

As of April 2020, Slyck is no longer accessible. The final archival by the Wayback Machine is dated 8 March 2020.
