= BearShare =

Peer-to-peer file sharing application

- Bearshare 5.2.5 running in Windows XP
- Developers: Free Peers, Inc. MusicLab, LLC.
- Release: December 4, 2000
- Final release: 10.0.0.131462 (January 29, 2013; 13 years ago) [±]
- Preview release: 10.0.970.48190 (August 24, 2012) [±]
- Operating system: Microsoft Windows
- Type: Peer-to-peer file sharing
- License: Proprietary software
- Website: http://www.bearshare.com/ (defunct)

BearShare was a peer-to-peer-file-sharing-application originally created by Free Peers, Inc. for Microsoft Windows and also a rebranded version of iMesh by MusicLab, LLC, tightly integrated with their music subscription service.

== History ==
The principal operators of Free Peers, Inc. were Vincent Falco and Louis Tatta. Bearshare was launched on December 4, 2000, as a Gnutella-based peer-to-peer file sharing application with innovative features that eventually grew to include IRC, a free library of software and media called BearShare Featured Artists, online help pages and a support forum integrated as dedicated web browser windows in the application; as well as a media player and a library window to organize the user's media collection.

Following the June 27, 2005 United States Supreme Court decision on the MGM Studios, Inc. v. Grokster, Ltd. case the BearShare Community support forums were abruptly closed during negotiations to settle an impending lawsuit with the RIAA. The webmaster and forum administrator immediately created a new site called Technutopia and the same support staff continue to support the gnutella versions from there. A few months later the unused Community window was removed from BearShare 5.1.

On May 4, 2006, Free Peers agreed to transfer all their BearShare-related assets to MusicLab, LLC (an iMesh subsidiary) and use the $30 million raised from that sale to settle with the RIAA.

On August 17, 2006, MusicLab released a reskinned and updated version of iMesh named BearSharev6 which connected to its proprietary iMesh network instead of gnutella. BearShareV6 and its successors offer paid music downloads in the PlaysForSure DRM controlled WMA format as well as free content in various formats, chiefly MP3. Like BearShare they also include a media player and embedded online and social networking features but with a Web 2.0 style, somewhat similar to MySpace or Facebook. Free content provided by users is automatically verified using acoustic fingerprinting as non-infringing before it can be shared. Video files more than 50 Mb in size and 15 minutes in length cannot be shared, ensuring television shows and feature-length movies cannot be distributed over the network. Only a limited set of music and video file types can be shared, thus excluding everything else like executable files, documents and compressed archives.

In August 2006, MusicLab released a variant of the original BearShare gnutella servant, called BearFlix, which was altered to limit sharing, searches and downloads to images and videos. Shared videos were limited in length and duration, similar to limits in BearShareV6. The first release was version 1.2.1. Its version numbers appear to start from 1.1.2.1 in the user interface but it presents itself on the gnutella network as versions 6.1.2.1 to 6.2.2.530. This version has since been discontinued by MusicLab and no longer available on their websites; however, it remains in wide usage.

On October 27, 2008, responding to uncertainty around the future of PlaysForSure, MusicLab added iPod support in BearShareV7.

As of June 12, 2016, BearShare is no longer available to download. The official page with a message announcing its discontinuation remained active until March 2017.

== Popular versions ==
Three variants of the original BearShare gnutella servant were distributed by Free Peers: Free, Lite, and Pro. The Free-version had higher performance limits than the Lite version but contained some adware. The Pro version had higher limits than both the Free and Lite versions but cost US$24. Version numbers in this series ranged from 1.0 to 5.2.5.9. Though lacking MusicLab's support a wide spread of BearShare versions from 4.7 to 5.2.5.6 remain the second most popular servant on gnutella, alongside LimeWire.

Old-School fans of the gnutella versions tend to favour the last of the beta versions, 5.1.0 beta25, because it has no adware, is hard-coded for performance levels roughly between Pro and regular (ad-supported) versions and has the unique ability to switch between leaf and ultrapeer mode on demand, a feature deemed necessary for effective testing. No other gnutella servant has enjoyed this capability.

The most recent MusicLab version, V10, was available by free download from their support website and "Pro" features could be unlocked with a six or twelve-month subscription. Access to premium content required a $9.95 monthly subscription. Customers in Canada and the U.S.A. could opt for a $14.95 monthly "BearShare ToGo" subscription which allowed downloads of premium music to portable music players.
