= FastTrack =

Peer to peer network protocol

FastTrack is a peer-to-peer (P2P) protocol that was used by the Kazaa, Grokster, iMesh and Morpheus file sharing programs. FastTrack was the most popular file sharing network in 2003, and used mainly for the exchange of music MP3 files. The network had approximately 2.4 million concurrent users in 2003. It is estimated that the total number of users was greater than that of Napster at its peak.

== History ==
The FastTrack protocol and Kazaa were created and developed by Estonian programmers of BlueMoon Interactive headed by Jaan Tallinn, the same team that later created Skype. After selling it to Niklas Zennström from Sweden and Janus Friis from Denmark, it was introduced in March 2001 by their Dutch company Consumer Empowerment. It appeared during the end of the first generation of P2P networks – Napster shut down in July of that year. There are three FastTrack-based networks, and they use mutually incompatible versions of the protocol. The most popular clients on each are Kazaa (and its variations), Grokster, and iMesh. For more information about the various lawsuits surrounding Kazaa and Sharman Networks, see Kazaa.

== Technology ==
FastTrack uses supernodes to improve scalability.

To allow downloading from multiple sources, FastTrack employs the UUHash hashing algorithm. While UUHash allows very large files to be checksummed in a short time, even on slow weak computers, it also allows for massive corruption of a file to go unnoticed. Many people, as well as the RIAA, have exploited this vulnerability to spread corrupt and fake files on the network.

The FastTrack protocol uses encryption and was not documented by its creators. The first clients were all closed source software. However, initialization data for the encryption algorithms is sent in the clear and no public key encryption is used, so reverse engineering was made comparatively easy. In 2003, open source programmers succeeded in reverse-engineering the portion of the protocol dealing with client-supernode communication, but the supernode-supernode communication protocol remains largely unknown.

== Clients ==
The following programs are or have been FastTrack clients:

- Kazaa and variants
- KCeasy (requires the gIFT-fasttrack plugin)
- Grokster
- iMesh
- Morpheus, until 2002
- Apollon - KDE-Based
- giFT-FastTrack – a giFT plugin
- MLDonkey, a free multi-platform multi-network file sharing client

== See also ==
- Kad network
- Overnet
- Open Music Model
- Comparison of file sharing applications
