= Morpheus (file-sharing software) =

Peer-to-peer file sharing client

- Developer: StreamCast Networks (defunct)
- Initial release: 2001
- Final release: 5.55.1 (November 15, 2007; 17 years ago) [±]
- Preview release: none [±]
- Written in: C++
- Operating system: Microsoft Windows
- Available in: English
- Type: P2P
- License: Proprietary
- Website: www.morpheus.com at the Wayback Machine (archived October 13, 2008)

Morpheus was a file sharing and searching peer-to-peer client for Microsoft Windows, developed and distributed by the company StreamCast, that originally used the OpenNap protocol, but later supported many different peer-to-peer protocols. On April 22, 2008, distributor StreamCast Networks filed for Chapter 7 bankruptcy after a long legal battle with music companies; all of their employees were laid off and the official download at www.morpheus.com stopped being available, though for a small period the website remained online. As of October 29, 2008, the official Morpheus website is offline, including all other websites owned by StreamCast Networks, specifically MusicCity.com, Streamcastnetworks.com and NeoNetwork.com.

== Availability ==
Users of the Morpheus community have set up a website (at GnutellaForums.com) where the Morpheus software can still be downloaded. At that site, there is a support forum and support chat room setup from the site and within the client.

== Presence of adware/spyware ==
The current version of Morpheus, version 5.5.1, contains no adware or spyware, and no additional software is bundled with Morpheus. However, when Morpheus is open and running, the interface contains online ads that are used to support the application.

During installation, an optional peer-to-peer Morpheus Toolbar is offered. Both the Morpheus application and the Morpheus Toolbar can be easily uninstalled with Windows Add/Remove Programs commands. However, this was not the case with previous versions.

Version 5.3 didn't install adware or spyware, though it did install some desktop shortcuts to adware websites and the Morpheus Toolbar without user approval.

== See also ==
- Comparison of file sharing applications
- Open Music Model
