= MLDonkey =

P2P filesharing client

- Initial release: 2001; 25 years ago
- Stable release: 3.2.1 / 20 August 2024; 20 months ago
- Preview release: none [±]
- Written in: OCaml, with some C and assembly
- Operating system: Microsoft Windows, OS X, Unix-like, MorphOS
- Type: P2P file sharing
- License: GPL-2.0-or-later
- Website: github.com/ygrek/mldonkey
- Repository: github.com/ygrek/mldonkey

MLDonkey is an open-source, multi-protocol, peer-to-peer file sharing application that runs as a back-end server application on many platforms. It can be controlled through a user interface provided by one of many separate front-ends, including a Web interface, telnet interface and over a dozen native client programs.

Originally a Linux client for the eDonkey protocol, it now runs on many flavors of Unix-like, OS X, Microsoft Windows and MorphOS and supports numerous peer-to-peer protocols.

It is written in OCaml, with some C and some assembly.

== History ==
Development of the software began in late 2001. The original developer of MLDonkey is Fabrice Le Fessant from INRIA. It was originally conceived as an effort to spread the use of OCaml in the open source community.

In January 2003, Slyck.com reported brief friction between MLDonkey developers and the official Overnet MetaMachine developers, which denounced MLDonkey as a "rogue client", allegedly for incorrect behavior on the network.

Versions before 3.0 have a known security vulnerability that allows an attacker with access to the web interface to read any file on the file system.

== Features ==
Features of MLdonkey core:

- Peer to peer (p2p) program that supports the following network protocols, either partially or completely:
  - FastTrack (Kazaa)
  - eDonkey network (with Overnet and Kad network)
  - BitTorrent (with Mainline DHT)
  - Direct Connect
  - HTTP/FTP
- Multiple control interfaces: telnet, web interface, third party GUIs.

Written in the OCaml programming language and licensed under the GPL-2.0-or-later license, the application separates the user interface (which can be a web browser, telnet, or a third-party GUI application) and the code that interacts with the peer-to-peer networks.

MLDonkey is able to connect simultaneously to different peers using different network protocols. In addition it can download and merge parts of one file from different network protocols although this feature is currently documented as experimental. MLDonkey runs in a terminal session and does not require a GUI environment, saving memory and processing resources. Behavior is controlled by editable configuration files, or—in a more user friendly fashion—from a separate user interface.

From release 2.9.0 (2007) on, support for gnutella and G2 are no longer compiled in by default as both plugins are buggy and currently unmaintained; however, it is still possible to compile them in by making the appropriate setting in the configuration file.

== Frontends ==
- P2P-GUI (web interface)
- Onager (Palm OS)
- Sancho
- MuleDroid - Interface Android

== See also ==
- Comparison of BitTorrent clients
