= OpenNap =

Open-source Napster file sharing server

- Original author(s): Drscholl
- Stable release: 0.44 Beta / 2001
- Repository: sourceforge.net/projects/opennap/files/
- Platform: UNIX, Linux, BSD/OS, Solaris, FreeBSD, Windows
- Available in: English
- Type: File sharing
- License: General Public Licence
- Website: https://opennap.sourceforge.net/

OpenNap was an open-source Napster server, extending the Napster protocol to allow sharing of any media type, and adding the ability to link servers together. It became popular after the original Napster network was shut down in 2001, but was subject to similar pressures and its use soon declined. As of 2024, the WinMX client is the only one still in use.

== History ==
The original Napster peer-to-peer file sharing service was a protocol which allowed users to transfer files directly between their clients. The protocol was reverse engineered by a developer nicknamed Drscholl and several other programmers. The first OpenNap servers appeared in 1999, operating in the same manner as Napster servers did. A client program connects to a centralized OpenNap server, search for, share and download files. The OpenNap server keeps track of all available files and provides clients the ability to search the index of available files and initiate a direct transfer between the clients. The files available via OpenNap servers are stored on the clients, never passing through the server. In addition, instant messages (private chat) and group chat services similar to IRC were also available.

OpenNap servers could be interconnected with each other to form networks. Clients could connect to multiple OpenNap networks. In 2000-2001 an indexing service for all OpenNap servers was created, called Napigator. Napigator allowed server administrators to add their server to a central list, so they could be easily (and often automatically) found by client software. The network was used for research into music tastes and preferences.

As the RIAA began to successfully dismantle Napster in the end of 2000, the population of OpenNap began to surge. Even though it appeared OpenNap would become the next Napster, it suffered from the same vulnerability as Napster: centralized servers. During OpenNap's peak in February 2002, the RIAA on behest of its member companies, began sending “Cease and Desist” notices to the biggest OpenNap networks. OpenNap was reduced from a population of over 250,000 to little more than 50,000 in less than five months.
