= FrostWire =

Free and open-source BitTorrent client

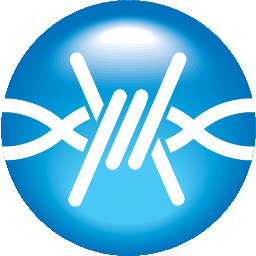

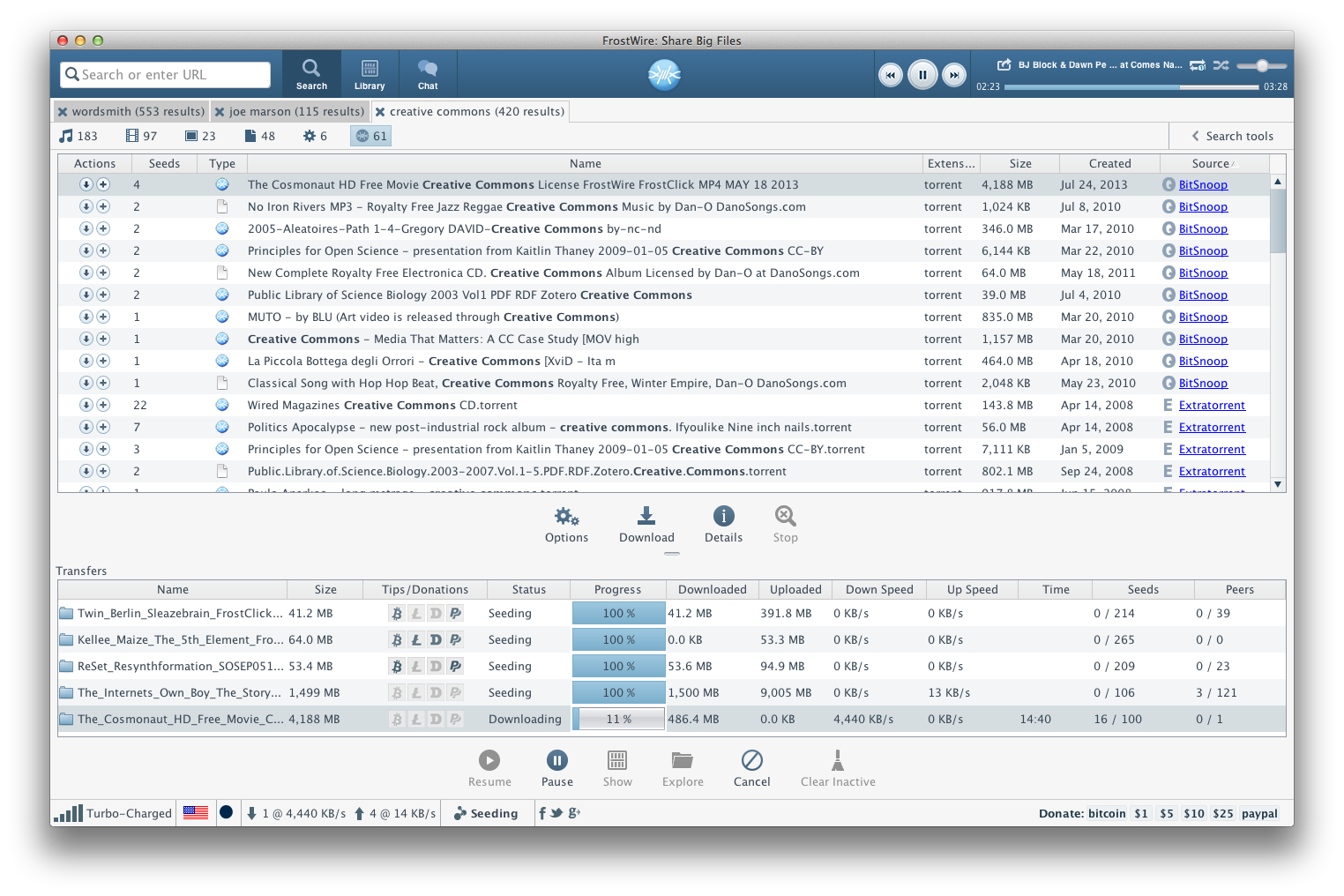
- FrostWire 6 on Mac OS X Snow Leopard
- Initial release: September 2004; 21 years ago

Stable release(s)
- Windows: 6.13.4-build-324 / 16 October 2024; 17 months ago
- macOS: 6.13.4-build-324 / 16 October 2024; 17 months ago
- Linux: 6.13.4-build-324 / 16 October 2024; 17 months ago
- Android: 2.9.4 / 26 December 2024; 14 months ago

Preview release(s) [±]
- None [±]
- Written in: Java
- Operating system: Windows, macOS, Linux and Android
- Size: 23.0 MB
- Type: Peer-to-peer file sharing
- License: GPL-3.0-or-later
- Website: frostwire.com
- Repository: github.com/frostwire/frostwire

FrostWire is a free and open-source BitTorrent client first released in September 2004, as a fork of LimeWire. It was initially very similar to LimeWire in appearance and functionality, but over time developers added more features, including support for the BitTorrent protocol. In version 5, support for the Gnutella network was dropped entirely, and FrostWire became a BitTorrent-only client.

== History ==
FrostWire, a BitTorrent client (formerly a Gnutella client), is a collaborative, open-source project licensed under the GPL-3.0-or-later license. In late 2005, concerned developers of LimeWire's open source community announced the start of a new project fork "FrostWire" that would protect the developmental source code of the LimeWire client. FrostWire has evolved to replace LimeWire's BitTorrent core for that of Vuze, the Azureus BitTorrent Engine, and ultimately to remove the LimeWire's Gnutella core to become a 100% BitTorrent client powered by the libtorrent library through FrostWire's jLibtorrent Java wrapper library since August 2014.

=== Gnutella client ===
The project was started in September 2004 after LimeWire's distributor considered adding "blocking" code in response to RIAA pressure. The RIAA threatened legal action against several peer-to-peer developers including LimeWire as a result of the U.S. Supreme Court's decision in MGM Studios, Inc. v. Grokster, Ltd..

The second beta release of FrostWire was available in the last quarter of 2005.

=== Multiprotocol P2P client ===
Since version 4.20.x, FrostWire was able to handle torrent files and featured a new junk filter. Also, in version 4.21.x support was added for most Android devices.

=== BitTorrent client ===
Since version 5.0 (2011), FrostWire relaunched itself as a BitTorrent application, so those using the Gnutella network either have to use version 4, or switch to another client altogether.

=== Preview before download ===
Since version 6.0, FrostWire adds preview files before download.

=== Adware and malware ===
Since around 2008 some members of the FrostWire community began to notice the distribution of the optional Ask.com toolbar in the Windows installers. On September 9, 2015, the official knowledge base claimed that FrostWire no longer distributes the Ask.com toolbar, and provided instructions on how to remove it. Around 2019, Frostwire has been noted to install other adware and malware, such as the browser hijacker WebDiscover.

== FrostWire 4 Legacy ==
Software based in the original FrostWire source (gnutella enabled) still exists, for example WireShare, a gnutella client that forked from the original FrostWire/LimeWire source in 2010, with the purpose of keeping the Gnutella network alive and to maintain a continuation of the original project (without adware, spyware and backdoors).

== FrostWire for Android ==
FrostWire/FrostWire Plus for Android (also known as FrostWire Downloader) is a native Android-based BitTorrent client, with additional support for downloading videos and music from YouTube. The application is based on the P2P BitTorrent network, with support for downloading music, movies, applications, as well as other content. The application also has support for downloading music from the cloud-based service SoundCloud, and includes a featured Music Library & Music Player.

== Features ==
Features present in FrostWire include:

- True In-App Search (Cloud Downloader + BitTorrent Client). FrostWire currently directly searches the following sources: YouTube, SoundCloud, Archive.org, PirateBay.org (finishing and list all). Results matching user's keywords are shown inside the app, separated into tabs by file type (Audio, Video, ....). If there are too many search results present, user can then filter the results by (keyword, size...)
- Magnet link support
- IPv6 support
- VPN Drop protection (optional)
- Create and seed a torrent
- Preview Files from Cloud Sources (YouTube / SoundCloud) can be fully previewed/streamed before downloading files from the BitTorrent Network can be consumed as soon as a sufficient amount of fist chunks is downloaded
- Media Library with Playlist Support
- Audio Player
- Video Player (desktop only)
- Lyrics display support if lyrics are included in mp3 files (Desktop only)
- Localized for 20+ languages
- Multiplatform: Android, Windows, Mac, Linux
- Jlibtorrent: A swig Java interface for libtorrent is by FrostWire developers.
- Media Browser on Android.

== See also ==
- Comparison of BitTorrent clients
- Comparison of Gnutella software
