= LimeWire =

Peer-to-peer file sharing application

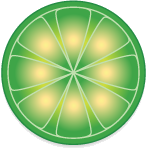

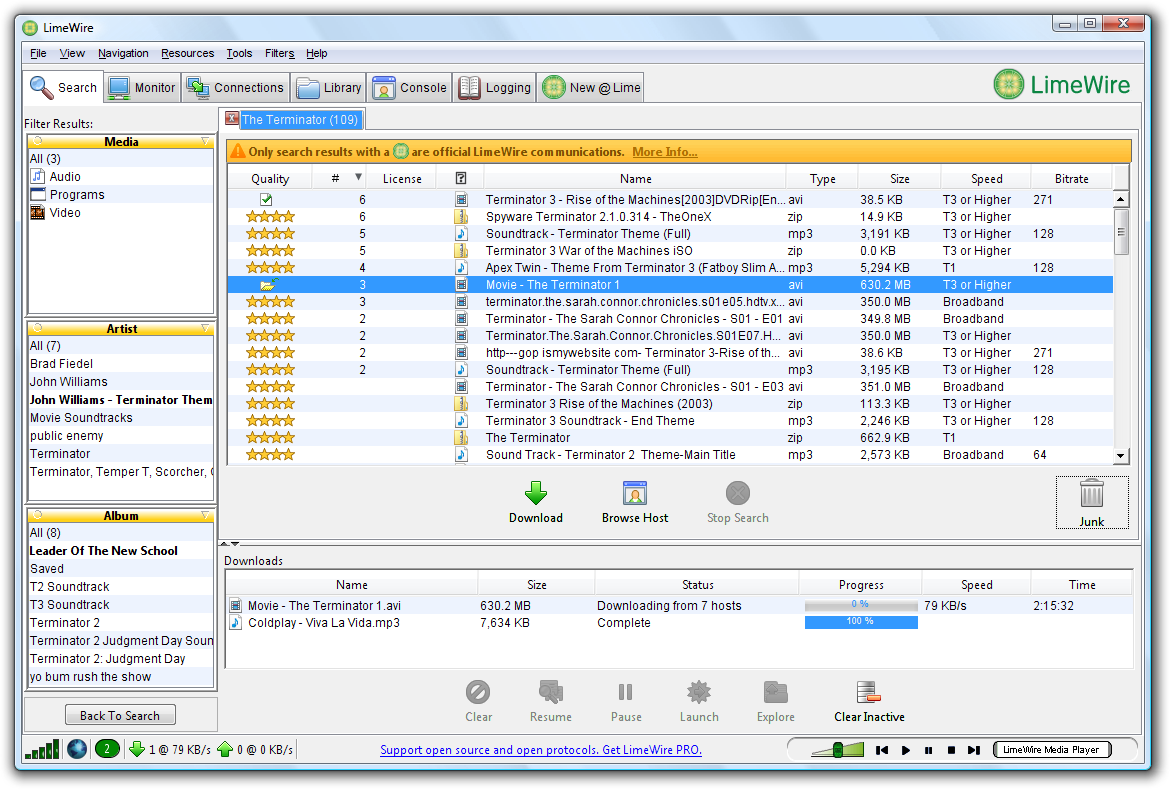
- LimeWire 4.18.3 on Windows Vista
- Developer: Lime Wire LLC
- Release: May 3, 2000; 26 years ago
- Final release: 5.5.16 / 26 October 2010; 16 years ago
- Preview release: 5.6.1 / 7 May 2010; 16 years ago
- Written in: Java
- Operating system: Windows, Mac OS X, Linux, Oracle Solaris
- Platform: Java SE
- Type: Peer-to-peer file sharing
- License: GPL-2.0-or-later
- Website: limewire.com

LimeWire is a free peer-to-peer file sharing client for Windows, Mac OS X, Linux, and Solaris. Created by Mark Gorton in 2000, it was most prominently a tool used for the download and distribution of pirated materials, particularly pirated music.

Both a zero-cost version and a purchasable "enhanced" version called LimeWire Pro were released. LimeWire uses the gnutella network as well as the BitTorrent protocol.

On October 26, 2010, U.S. federal court judge Kimba Wood issued an injunction ordering Lime Wire LLC to prevent "the searching, downloading, uploading, file trading and/or file distribution functionality, and/or all functionality" of its software in Arista Records LLC v. Lime Group LLC. A trial investigating the damages necessary to compensate the affected record labels was scheduled to begin in January 2011. As a result of the injunction, the Recording Industry Association of America initially suggested that LimeWire was responsible for $72 trillion in damages, before eventually settling for $105 million. Thereafter, the company stopped distributing the LimeWire software, and versions 5.5.11 and newer have been disabled using a backdoor installed by the company. However, version 5.5.10 and all prior versions of LimeWire remain fully functional and cannot be disabled unless a user upgrades to one of the newer versions.

== Features ==
Written in the Java programming language, LimeWire can run on any computer with a Java Virtual Machine installed. Installers were provided for Apple's Mac OS X, Microsoft's Windows, and Linux. Support for Mac OS 9 and other previous versions was dropped with the release of LimeWire 4.0.10. From version 4.8 onwards, LimeWire works as a UPnP Internet Gateway Device controller in that it can automatically set up packet-forwarding rules with UPnP-capable routers.

LimeWire offers sharing of its library through the Digital Audio Access Protocol (DAAP). As such, when LimeWire is running and configured to allow it, any files shared are detectable and downloaded on the local network by DAAP-enabled devices (e.g., Zune, iTunes). Beginning with LimeWire 4.13.9, connections can be encrypted with Transport Layer Security (TLS). Following LimeWire 4.13.11, TLS became the default connection option.

== Version history ==
Until October 2010, Lime Wire LLC, the New York City based developer of LimeWire, distributed two versions of the program: a basic free version, and an enhanced version, LimeWire PRO, which sold for a fee of $21.95 with 6 months of updates, or around $35.00 with 1 year of updates. The company claimed the paid version provides faster downloads and 66% better search results. This is accomplished by facilitating direct connection with up to 10 hosts of an identical searched file at any one time, whereas the free version is limited to a maximum of 8 hosts.

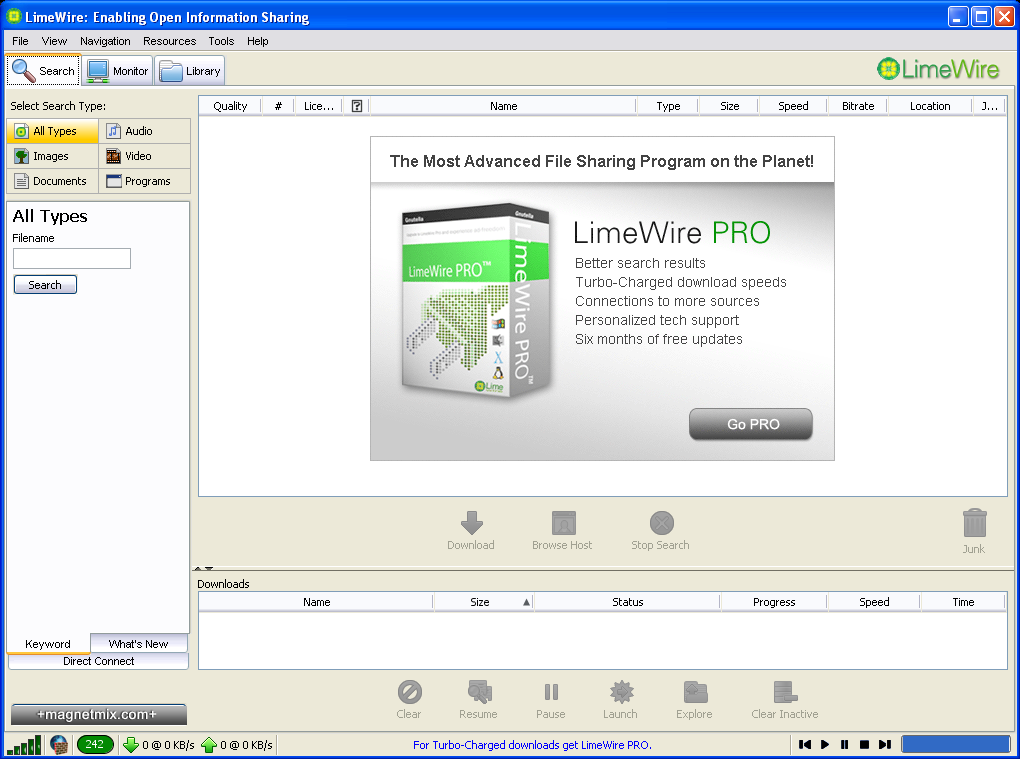
LimeWire 2

Being free software, LimeWire has spawned forks, including LionShare, an experimental software development project at Penn State University, and Acquisition, a Mac OS X-based gnutella client with a proprietary interface. Researchers at Cornell University developed a reputation management add-in called Credence that allows users to distinguish between "genuine" and "suspect" files before downloading them. An October 12, 2005, report states that some of LimeWire's contributors have forked the project and called it FrostWire.

LimeWire was the second file sharing program after FrostWire to support firewall-to-firewall file transfers, a feature introduced in version 4.2, which was released in November 2004. LimeWire included BitTorrent support, but it was limited to three torrent uploads and three torrent downloads, which coexisted with ordinary downloads. LimeWire 5.0 added an instant messenger that uses the XMPP Protocol, a free software communication protocol. Users can chat and share files with individuals or a group of friends in their buddy list.

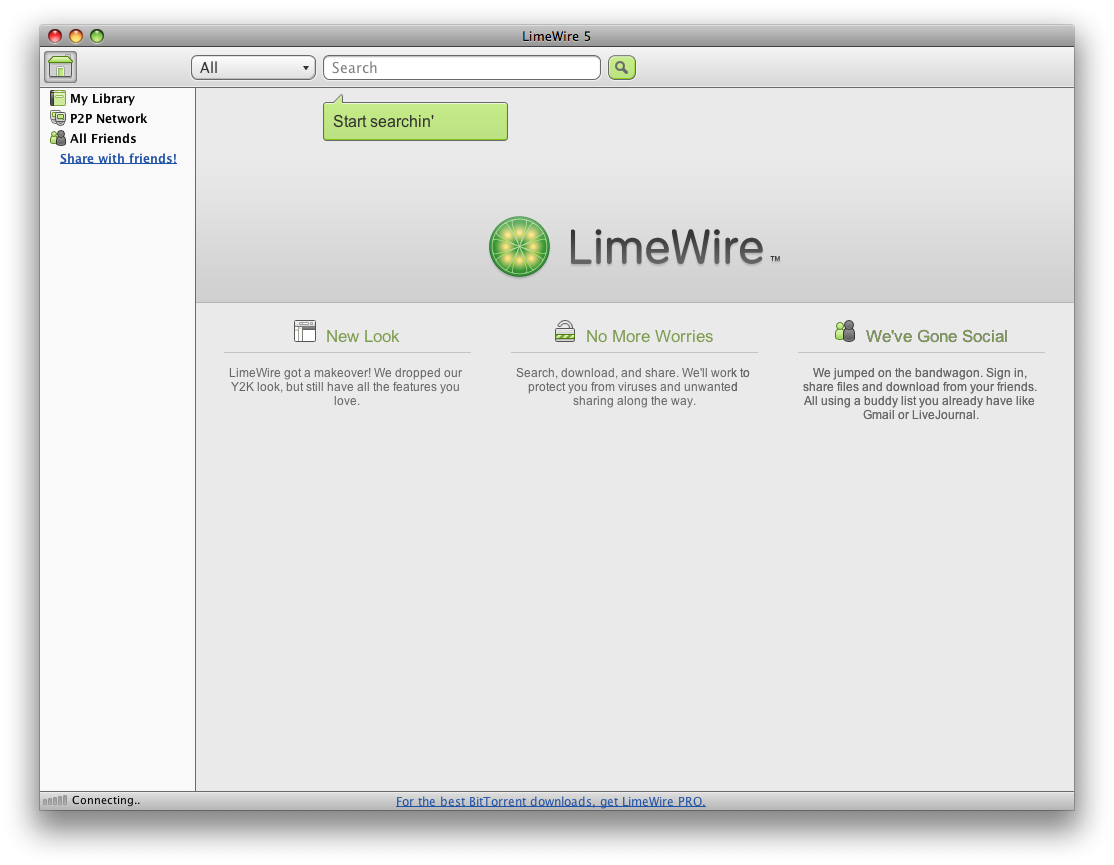
A screenshot of Limewire 5 0 11 beta

From version 5.5.1, LimeWire has added a key activation, which requires the user to enter the unique key before activating the "Pro" version of the software. This has stopped people from using downloaded "Pro" versions without authorization. However, there are still ways to bypass this security feature, which was done when creating the "Pirate Edition". For example, cracked versions of LimeWire were available on the Internet (including on LimeWire itself), and people could continue using the LimeWire Pro 5.5.1 Beta, which also includes AVG for LimeWire and is the first version to include AVG. The most recent stable version of LimeWire is 5.5.16.

Versions of LimeWire prior to 5.5.10 can still connect to the Gnutella network and users of these versions are still able to download files, even though a message is displayed concerning the injunction during the startup process of the software. LimeWire versions 5.5.11 and newer feature an auto-update feature that allowed Lime Wire LLC to disable newer versions of the LimeWire software. Older versions of LimeWire prior to version 5.5.11, however, do not include the auto-update feature and are still fully functional. As a result, neither the Recording Industry Association of America (RIAA) nor Lime Wire LLC have the ability to disable older versions of LimeWire, unless the user chooses to upgrade to a newer version of LimeWire.

On November 10, 2010, a secret group of developers called the "Secret Dev Team" sought to keep the application working by releasing the "LimeWire Pirate Edition". The software is based on LimeWire 5.6 Beta, and is aimed to allow Windows versions to still work and remove the threat of spyware or adware. The exclusive features in LimeWire PRO were also unlocked, and all security features installed by Lime Wire LLC were removed.

== Forks and alternatives ==
A number of forks of LimeWire have been released, many with the goal of giving users more freedom, or in objection to design decisions made by the original developers.

=== FrostWire ===
FrostWire was started in September 2004 by members of the LimeWire community, after LimeWire's distributor considered adding "blocking" code, in response to RIAA pressure and the threat of legal action, in light of the U.S. Supreme Court's decision in MGM Studios, Inc. v. Grokster, Ltd.. When eventually activated, the code could block its users from sharing licensed files. This code was changed when lawsuits had been filed against LimeWire for P2P downloading. It had blocked all their users and redirected them to FrostWire. FrostWire has since completely moved to the BitTorrent protocol from Gnutella (LimeWire's file sharing network).

=== LimeWire Pirate Edition/WireShare ===
In November 2010, as a response to the legal challenges regarding LimeWire, an anonymous individual by the handle of Meta Pirate released a modified version of LimeWire Pro, which was named LimeWire Pirate Edition. It came without the Ask.com toolbar, advertising, spyware, and backdoors, as well as all dependencies on Lime Wire LLC servers.

In response to allegations that a current or former member of Lime Wire LLC staff wrote and released the software, the company has stated they were "not behind these efforts. LimeWire does not authorize them. LimeWire is complying with the Court's October 26, 2010 injunction."

The LimeWire team, after being accused by the RIAA of being complicit in the development of LimeWire Pirate Edition, swiftly acted to shut down the LimeWire Pirate Edition website. A court order was issued to close down the website, and, to remain anonymous, Meta Pirate, the developer of LimeWire PE, did not contest the order.

Following the shutdown, the original LimeWire Pirate Edition project was reforked into WireShare, with the intent to keep the Gnutella network alive and to maintain a good faith continuation of the original project (without adware or spyware); development of the software continues to this day.

=== MuWire ===
MuWire was released in August 2020 as a free software program resembling LimeWire. Developed by a former LimeWire developer, it uses I2P to anonymize connections and transfers. MuWire's developer had purchased the limewire.com domain after it had been allowed to expire, and redirected traffic to MuWire's website for approximately two years, until finally selling it to an unaffiliated party.

== Criticism ==
Prior to April 2004, the free version of LimeWire was distributed with a bundled program called LimeShop (a variant of TopMoxie), which was spyware. Among other things, LimeShop monitored online purchases in order to redirect sales commissions to Lime Wire LLC. Uninstallation of LimeWire would not remove LimeShop. These objections were addressed in 2004 with the removal of all bundled software in LimeWire 3.9.4.

In LimeWire versions before 5.0, users could accidentally configure the software to allow access to any file on their computer, including documents with personal information. Later versions of LimeWire disabled unintentional sharing of documents or applications. In 2005, the US Federal Trade Commission issued a warning regarding the dangers of peer-to-peer file sharing network usage, due to the risk of identity theft and lawsuits.

For example, a 2007 identity theft scheme involving LimeWire was discovered in what the U.S. Justice Department described as its first case against someone accused of using file sharing computer programs to commit identity theft. The perpetrator had used LimeWire to search other people's computers for inadvertently shared financial information, which he used it to obtain credit cards for an online shopping spree.

One investigation showed that of 123 randomly selected downloaded files, 37 contained malware – about 30%. In mid-2008, a Macintosh trojan exploiting a vulnerability involving Apple Remote Desktop was distributed via LimeWire affecting users of Mac OS X Tiger and Leopard. The ability to distribute such malware and viruses was reduced in versions of LimeWire 5.0 and greater, whose default search settings excluded executable files.

After several years of opposing software bundling, LimeWire released an Ask.com-powered browser toolbar in 2010, which was automatically installed unless a user opted out. LimeWire automatically received a cryptographically signed file, called simpp.xml, containing an IP block list. It was the key technology behind the now defunct cyber security firm Tiversa which is alleged to have used information from the network to pressure prospective clients into engaging the company's services.

== Downfall ==
According to a June 2005 report in The New York Times, Lime Wire LLC was considering ceasing its distribution of LimeWire because the outcome of MGM v. Grokster "handed a tool to judges that they can declare inducement whenever they want to". Nevertheless, the company continued operating and was sued by Arista Records, which obtained a favorable decision in 2010. Judge Kimba Wood of the United States District Court for the Southern District of New York ruled in Arista Records LLC v. Lime Group LLC that LimeWire and Gorton had committed copyright infringement, engaged in unfair competition, and induced others to commit copyright infringement. Later in the year, after losing another court battle, with the RIAA, LimeWire was ordered to disable many of its software's capabilities due to the possibility of copyright infringement. The RIAA also announced its intention to seek damages for the program's effects on various record labels. In response to the ruling, a company spokesperson said that the company planned to continue operating and would cease distributing and supporting P2P software. RIAA announced a further lawsuit in early 2011, claiming statutory damages of $72 trillion, more than triple the world's annual GDP. The figure relied on an estimate of thousands of downloads for each of the platform's 11,000 songs. In May 2011, Gorton agreed to a settlement whereby the company would pay thirteen record labels approximately $105 million. Mitch Bainwol, chairman of the RIAA, referred to the "resolution of the case [as] another milestone in the continuing evolution of online music to a legitimate marketplace that appropriately rewards creators."

== Sale and reuse of brand ==
In 2022, Austrian brothers Julian and Paul Zehetmayr bought LimeWire's intellectual property and turned it into an NFT service. LimeWire's name was revived in 2022 for an unrelated music-based NFT platform, an action with which Gorton expressed displeasure. The NFT marketplace was launched in July 2022, with the first NFT collection from American record producer and rapper 7 Aurelius.

In September 2023, it bought BlueWillow, a generative AI tool, and became a place to share images and videos created with it.

In 2025, it acquired snapdrop.net and sharedrop.io, two similar but unrelated services which allowed instant file sharing over a local network.

In September 2025, it acquired the Fyre Festival brand, including its intellectual property, trademarks, online domains, and social media assets, from Billy McFarland via an auction held on eBay.

In December 2025, it acquired the file sharing website filetransfer.io, and began offering cloud-based file sharing services.

== See also ==
- Comparison of file-sharing applications
- Open music model

=== Similar court rulings ===
- AllOfMP3
- Grooveshark
- Kazaa
- Mininova
- Megaupload
- Napster
