= IMesh =

Defunct file sharing client

iMesh
- Developers: iMesh, Inc.
- Release: November 1999; 27 years ago
- Written in: C++
- Operating system: Windows
- Size: 14.0 MB
- Type: Peer-to-peer
- License: Proprietary
- Website: www.imesh.com

iMesh was a media and file sharing client that was available in nine languages. It used a proprietary, centralized, P2P network (IM2Net) operating on ports 80, 443 and 1863. iMesh was owned by American company iMesh, Inc., who maintained development centers around the world. As of 2009, it was the third most popular music subscription service in the US.

iMesh operated the first "RIAA-approved" P2P service, allowing users residing in the United States and Canada to download music content of choice for a monthly fee in the form of either a Premium subscription or a "ToGo" subscription. This subscription-based approach is advocated by theories such as the Open Music Model. A third option was also available for users (residing in either country) to permanently purchase tracks for 99 cents (USD) each, without a subscription.

In September 2013, the website of iMesh was hacked and approximately 50M accounts were exposed. The data was later put up for sale on a dark market website in mid-2016 and included email and IP addresses, usernames and salted MD5 hashes.

== Shutdown ==
On June 9, 2016, iMesh shut down their service without prior notification. Their top-level web page was changed to read "We are sad to inform you that iMesh is no longer available." Their Support page was changed to read "Due to changes in the music industry we regret to inform you that iMesh will no longer be available for download, and will no longer sell subscriptions or music tracks." They posted to their Facebook page: "After many years of wonderful music, iMesh is no longer available. Thank you for listening with us. Stay tuned for our next adventure." Multiple Facebook users commented on the post to express frustration that they had no way to contact friends made via the iMesh social networking features.

== Legal aspects ==
=== RIAA lawsuit ===
On September 18, 2003 the RIAA (Recording Industry Association of America) sued iMesh for encouraging copyright infringement. iMesh settled the lawsuit a little over 10 months later on July 20, 2004, where according to the RIAA, the terms of the settlement were that iMesh would pay them US$4.1 million and could continue operating as normal (unlike Grokster) while implementing a paid service (iMesh 6.0). iMesh had first agreed to have the new service available by the end of 2004, but this was pushed back towards the end of 2005 due to technicalities.

=== Legality ===
After the relaunch, iMesh was advertised as a 100% legal P2P client, and acknowledged as being so by the RIAA. This was because downloads through the client were limited to a select database of 15 million licensed songs and videos.

The iMesh 6 client (and later versions) achieved this by detecting attempts to download copyrighted material and blocking the transfer through the use of acoustic fingerprinting, provided by content protection company Audible Magic.

An agreement with the MPAA had also been reached. Video files more than 50 MB in size and 15 minutes in length could no longer be shared on the iMesh network, ensuring feature-length releases would not be transferred across the network.
