= List of software forks =

This is a list of notable software forks.

A timeline chart of how Linux distributions forked. The three largest trees are (from top) Debian, SLS and Red Hat.

== Undated ==
- The many varieties of proprietary Unix in the 1980s and 1990s – almost all derived from AT&T Unix under licence and all called "Unix", but increasingly mutually incompatible. See Unix wars.
- Most Linux distributions are descended from other distributions, most being traceable back to Debian, Red Hat or Softlanding Linux System (see image right). Since most of the content of a distribution is free and open source software, ideas and software interchange freely as is useful to the individual distribution. Merges (e.g., United Linux or Mandriva) are rare.
- Pretty Good Privacy, forked outside of the United States to free it from restrictive US laws on the export of cryptography software.
- The game Hack forked NetHack (1987) which then forked several variants using the original code, notably Slash'EM (1997).
- Openswan and strongSwan, from the discontinued FreeS/WAN.

== 1981 ==
- Symbolics Lisp Machine operating system, later called Symbolics Genera. Forked from the MIT Lisp Machine operating system, which was licensed by MIT to Symbolics in 1980. This fork later motivated Richard Stallman to start the GNU Project.

== 1985 ==
- POSTGRES (later PostgreSQL), after Ingres branched off as a proprietary project.

== 1990 ==
- Microsoft SQL Server, from Sybase SQL Server, via a technology-sharing agreement concerning the Tabular Data Stream protocol.
- SWLPC, from LPMud.

== 1991 ==
- Xemacs, from GNU Emacs, originally for Lucid Corporation internal needs.

== 1993 ==
- FreeBSD, started as a patchkit to 386BSD.
- NetBSD, started as a patchkit to 386BSD.

== 1995 ==
- Apache HTTP Server, from the moribund NCSA HTTPd.
- OpenBSD, a fork of NetBSD 1.0 by Theo de Raadt due to internal developer personality clashes.

== 1997 ==
- EGCS was a fork of GCC, later named as the official version.

== 1998 ==
- Grace, from Xmgr, after that project ceased development.

== 1999 ==
- FilmGIMP, later called CinePaint, from GIMP, to handle 48-bit colour.
- OSSH from SSH, when that project was proprietised.
- OpenSSH, from OSSH.
- Sodipodi, from Gill.
- Steel Bank Common Lisp, from CMU Common Lisp.

== 2000 ==
- TrueCrypt, from E4M when the latter was discontinued.
- Tux Racer went proprietary in 2000, leading to several forks including OpenRacer, PlanetPenguin Racer and Extreme Tux Racer.
- OpenOffice.org, from StarOffice after Sun Microsystems made the source code publicly available. OpenOffice.org was eventually forked into LibreOffice.

== 2001 ==
- ELinks, began as an experimental fork of Links.
- Fluxbox, from Blackbox.
- GNU Radio, from pSpectra.
- Xvid, was a fork of OpenDivX.
- WebKit, project was started within Apple by Lisa Melton on 25 June 2001 as a fork of KHTML.

== 2002 ==
- GForge, from SourceForge.
- GraphicsMagick, from ImageMagick due to concerns over the openness of development.
- The Matroska container format, from the Multimedia Container Format, due to differences in direction.
- MirOS BSD, from OpenBSD.
- Syllable Desktop, from the stagnant AtheOS.

== 2003 ==
- aMule, from xMule, which itself forked from lMule shortly before, over developer disagreements.
- b2evolution, from b2/CafeLog.
- DragonFly BSD, from FreeBSD 4.8 by long-time FreeBSD developer Matt Dillon, due to disagreement over FreeBSD 5's technical direction.
- Epiphany, from Galeon, after developer disagreements about Galeon's growing complexity.
- Inkscape (vector-graphics program), from Sodipodi.
- NeoOffice, a fork of OpenOffice.org, with an incompatible license (GPL rather than LGPL), due to disagreements about licensing and about the best method to port OpenOffice.org to Mac OS X.
- The Safari renderer that became WebKit, from KHTML.
- sK1, from Skencil when the latter moved from Tk to GTK+.
- WordPress, from b2/CafeLog.
- Zen Cart, from osCommerce.

== 2004 ==
- Baz, the previous version of Bazaar, from GNU arch.
- FrostWire, from LimeWire after LimeWire's developers considered adding RIAA-sponsored blocking code.
- MediaPortal, from XBMC.
- WineX (later Cedega), was a proprietary fork of Wine.
- XOrg, from XFree86, in order to adopt a more open development model and due to concerns over the latter's change to a license many distributors found unacceptable.

== 2005 ==
- Audacious, from Beep Media Player to continue work on the old version of that project.
- Joomla, from Mambo due to concerns over project structure.
- Claws Mail, from Sylpheed, due to perceived slowness in accepting enhancements.

== 2006 ==
- Adempiere, a community maintained fork of Compiere 2.5.3b, due to disagreement with commercial and technical direction of Compiere Inc.
- Cdrkit, from Cdrtools due to perceived licensing issues.
- LedgerSMB, from SQL-Ledger, due to disagreements over handling of security issues.
- MindTouch, a fork of MediaWiki.
- Mulgara, from Kowari after trademark threats from Northrop Grumman.
- MPC-HC, a fork of Media Player Classic.

== 2007 ==
- Go-oo, from OpenOffice.org, due to that project's contributor licensing agreement.

== 2008 ==
- Boxee, a proprietary fork of XBMC.
- Dreamwidth, from LiveJournal by ex-LiveJournal developers.
- Drizzle, was intended as a slimmed-down and faster fork of MySQL.
- MiaCMS, from Mambo.
- Plex, a proprietary fork of XBMC.

== 2009 ==
- dbndns, from djbdns after the latter was released into the public domain and abandoned.
- Freeplane, from FreeMind.
- FusionForge, from GForge when GForge shifted focus to its proprietary version.
- Icinga, from Nagios, due to perceived slow development and problems dealing with Nagios LLC.
- kompoZer, from Nvu after that project went dormant.
- MariaDB, from MySQL, over concern as to Sun Microsystems' plans for the latter.
- Pale Moon, from Firefox.
- Qt Extended Improved, from Qtopia after the latter was discontinued by Qt Software.
- Voddler, is a proprietary fork of XBMC and FFmpeg.

== 2010 ==
- Peppermint Linux OS, from Lubuntu, due to a perceived need for a cloud-centric derivative of the Ubuntu OS.
- Chamilo, from Dokeos, due to community management concerns with that project.
- LibreOffice, from OpenOffice.org (and merging Go-oo), due to Oracle Corporation's perceived neglect of the software.
- OpenIndiana, from OpenSolaris after Oracle Corporation discontinued the latter.
  - Illumos, from the OpenSolaris kernel OS/Net, after Oracle ended public access to the source code.
- webtrees, from PhpGedView, due to SourceForge's policy on exporting encryption.
- Xonotic, from Nexuiz, after that project was taken proprietary.
- Mageia, from Mandriva Linux, due to financial uncertainty and the layoff by Edge-IT, a Mandriva subsidiary employing many of the corporate staff working on the Mandriva distribution
- OpenAM, from OpenSSO after Oracle Corporation discontinued the latter.
- Calligra, from KOffice after developer disagreements.

== 2011 ==
- Fire OS, a fork of Android for the Kindle Fire
- Jenkins, from Hudson (2011), due to Oracle Corporation's perceived neglect of the project's infrastructure and disagreements over use of the name on non-Oracle-maintained infrastructure.
- Univa Grid Engine, from Oracle Grid Engine, after Oracle Corporation stopped releasing project source.
- Mer, started as a fork of MeeGo.
- libav, a fork of ffmpeg.
- WooCommerce, a fork of Jigoshop.

== 2012 ==
- MPC-BE, a fork of Media Player Classic

== 2013 ==
- Blink, a fork of WebKit.
- SuiteCRM, from the last open source version of SugarCRM.

== 2014 ==
- LibreSSL, from OpenSSL.
- Nokia X software platform, a fork of the Android Open Source Project developed by Nokia exclusively for its X family of Android smartphones.
- io.js from node.js. In 2015 it was blessed as the official version of node.js.

== 2015 ==
- EdgeHTML, from Trident
- Open Live Writer, from Windows Live Writer 2012

== 2016 ==
- Collabora Online, from LibreOffice, Collabora Online is a web-based enterprise ready edition of LibreOffice
- Goanna, from Gecko
- Nextcloud, from ownCloud
- LineageOS, from CyanogenMod

== 2017 ==
- Bitcoin Cash, from Bitcoin Core, supported by the forked implementations Bitcoin ABC, Bitcoin Unlimited and Bitcoin XT.
- Unified XUL Platform, from XUL.

== 2018 ==
- Basilisk, from Firefox.

== 2019 ==
- Trino, from Presto.

== 2021 ==
- BuzzlyArt, from Artrise
- Floorp, a free and open-source Japanese web browser based on Firefox.

== 2022 ==
- Angie, from Nginx.

== 2023 ==
- OpenTofu, from Terraform.

== 2024 ==
- Freenginx, from Nginx.
- Valkey, from Redis
- CoMaps, from Organic Maps

== See also ==
- List of Lisp-family programming languages
