= VeryCD =

Chinese file sharing website

- Website type: File-sharing
- Owners: Shanghai Source Networking Technology Co., Ltd, Huang Yimeng
- Creator: Huang Yimeng
- Website: VeryCD.com
- Commercial: Yes
- Registration: Optional
- Launched: 2003–2011
- Content license: CC BY-SA 1.0

VeryCD is a Chinese website that shares files via eD2k links. The website was begun in September 2003 by Huang Yimeng (Chinese: 黄一孟). In June 2005, Shanghai Source Networking Technology Co., Ltd (Chinese: 上海维西网络科技有限公司, or VeryCD company) was established. It is a for-profit organization headquartered in Shanghai, China. Today, VeryCD is one of the most popular file-sharing (via ed2k links) websites in China.

== Aims ==
According to VeryCD company, VeryCD.com "aims to be the biggest and the most user-friendly P2P seed database website in the world. […] Its declaration against corruption from capitalized operation kept the website organized and free of advertisement abuse." But some people thought that it was contradictory, since VeryCD was already a commercial company which had a lot of advertisement on the website. The creator of the website and leader of the VeryCD company, Huang Yimeng was also listed in a "list of Chinese multimillionaires born in 1980s" by some Chinese media.

== Software ==
Two eDonkey network clients, eMule VeryCD Mod and easyMule, are developed by VeryCD company.

=== eMule VeryCD Mod ===
eMule VeryCD Mod developed since 2003 is based on eMule and open-sourced. It has a built-in browser to access the Web.

Due to the censorship in China, eMule VeryCD Mod has a search word filter to prevent users from searching some political or pornographic words.

=== easyMule ===
easyMule developed since 2007 is now the company's primary client. It removes the category, message, IRC, custom skin and some other features from eMule, adds BHO (Browser Helper Object) plug-in to users' IE browser. The browser built in easyMule can only access VeryCD.com site.

easyMule's users can't search via eDonkey servers or Kad network, it is only allowed to search from the links indexed by VeryCD.com.

easyMule version 1 is eMule-based and open-sourced. Since v2.0, easyMule has closed its source. VeryCD company's developer claimed that easyMule 2.0 is written from scratch by them. On 1 July 2009, an aMule developer wrote a topic on VeryCD's group, claiming that easyMule is built over code of aMule which is a GPLed eD2k client, and asking for the code. But this was said to be "purely irresponsible nonsense" and refused by VeryCD's owner Huang Yimeng.

=== Anti-leech ===
The two clients implement eMule Xtreme Mod's Dynamic Leecher Protection (DLP) to ban leecher-mods, but use their own modified source-closed dll library file. They removed Xunlei from the blacklist, and have falsely banned Xtreme, MorphXT and some other eMule mods twice in November 2008 and May 2010.

=== Fake eMule ===
eMule VeryCD Mod's official website, emule.org.cn, named "Dianlv (eMule) Chinese Site" (电驴(eMule)中文网站), is criticized in that it misleads users and pretends to be eMule's official website.

"Dianlv" (simplified Chinese: 电驴; traditional Chinese: 電驢; pinyin: diàn lǘ; lit. 'Electronic Donkey') is eDonkey's Chinese name. Some Chinese users call eMule "Dianlv" as well. VeryCD company has tried to register both "eMule" and "Dianlv" for trademarks in China, but not approved up to now. However, easyMule (version 1 and 2) was named "Dianlv" in Chinese by the company. VeryCD.com claims itself to be the official "Dianlv" site. The name of "Dianlv" is considered to be another misleading.

VeryCD sometimes deletes topics about the real official eMule and non-VeryCD clients on its site.

== Feature ==
There used to be a Discussion forum powered by Invision Power Board. Now the forum registration has been stopped. The new "groups" (社区) is being used.

More than 150 thousands shared contents pages had been published and indexed, accessible to its search engine. On these pages, Files' eD2k links are shared freely by users.

=== MP3! ===
MP3! was a music sharing project by VeryCD that is intended to be the largest music library in the P2P world and indexed by VeryCD. It maintains requirements for the seeder to have standardized MP3 format with ID3 tags for metadata, standardized RAR packing method, album cover, introduction to VeryCD and its project, no repeat publication of the same content and have enough bandwidth. MP3 items were forced to join this project for publishing on VeryCD.com. Since some users were against this advertisement project, now it is no longer forced.

== Copyright ==
VeryCD announces that all the things on VeryCD.com are licensed under CC BY-SA 1.0.

== History ==
In 2010, VeryCD formed a videogame company under the name XD Network (Chinese: 心动网络), which launched the mobile app store TapTap in 2016. In 2017, after XD Network acquired a majority stake in Shanghai-based games publisher Longcheng (Chinese: 上海龙成网络科技有限公司), the company renamed to XD Global. The company became publicly traded on the Hong Kong Stock Exchange in 2019.

== Incidents ==
=== Warning from administration ===
On 27 October 2008, China's State Administration of Radio Film and Television claimed that VeryCD.com and some other sites have violated various regulations, including the publishing of horrific, violent or pornographic content, and operating a video site without proper approval. None of the sites were warned due to piracy issues.

=== Users' quitting ===
At the end of November 2008, the discussion forum was abandoned, users were forced to use the "groups". At the meantime, VeryCD Mod falsely banned eMule Xtreme Mod, leading to users' dissatisfaction and quitting.

=== Takedown ===
The site was temporarily taken offline on 9 December 2009. The homepage was on that date replaced by a message claiming server's technical difficulties. One of VeryCD's creators Dai Yunjie affirmed that, and claimed that it had nothing with Chinese administrations. The site returned to functional status one day after.

=== Remove links ===
On 23 January 2011, eD2k links to all the music, movies and TV series on the site were removed.

== See also ==
- File sharing
- eMule
- eDonkey network
