= Dtella =

Dtella is a free and open-source, peer-to-peer file sharing client that connects to a distributed, decentralized DC++ Direct Connect network. Dtella allows the creation of a file-sharing intra-net with decentralized communication between clients. This lets clients on the same network share files without an internet connection, avoiding internet bandwidth limitations.

Dtella is pronounced "dee-tell-uh" and the name originates from the rough contraction of "DC++ GNUtella"—a P2P system that shares a similar network structure to Dtella (though Dtella does not derive from it)

== History ==
Dtella originated at Purdue from a need to share files on a network without being limited by Purdue's bandwidth limit (for residents of its residence halls) and to avoid anti-piracy take-down notices. Dtella started as a client for DCGate, which used a DC network linked via IRC directory nodes. DCGate originally provided Purdue with IRC-based network transfers at about 1 MB/sec.

Dtella grew into a decentralized system offering several improvements over the now deprecated DCGate project. While DCGate featured main IRC directory nodes, Dtella is decentralized, making it harder to shut down. DCgate translated between DC and IRC protocols, while Dtella forms a P2P mesh network allowing it to not rely on IRC or any other central node. This additionally made it more adaptable to other universities and faster to spread, as it needed no central node set up and maintained. Bandwidth caps for large networked entities such as university residence halls are common practice, attributing to Dtella's spread and growth across multiple universities. Currently, many forks of Dtella exist, some are listed below.

== Forks ==
=== Notable Forks ===
Dtella@Purdue

- Dtella@Purdue
- The original Dtella hub. Active from 2004 to May 13, 2023.
- One of the most active Dtella communities

Dtella@Berkeley

- Dtella@Berkeley
- Moved to UC Berkeley in Fall 2010
- No longer a Dtella Community

Dtella@Home

- Dtella@Home
- For Home and off-campus use.

=== Other known Forks ===
- Dtella@MS
- Files@USYD
- Dtella@CMU
- Dtella@McGill
- Dtella@Cambridge
- Dtella@IH
- Dtella@PKDC
- Dtella@UMD
