= Donkey (disambiguation) =

A donkey is a domesticated, four-legged animal, closely related to the horse.

Donkey may also refer to:

== Arts, entertainment, and media ==
=== Fictional characters ===
- Donkey (Shrek), a character from the Shrek movies
- Donkey Kong (character), a Nintendo video game character

=== Films ===
- Donkey (film), a 2009 Croatian film
- Donkeys (film), a 2010 Scottish film

=== Music ===
- Donkey (band), a band formed in Athens, Georgia
- Donkey (album), second album from Brazilian band Cansei De Ser Sexy
- "Donkey" (song), by Jerrod Niemann

=== Other arts, entertainment, and media ===
- Donkey, poker jargon meaning "a bad player"
- DONKEY.BAS, a 1981 game created by Bill Gates to show off the capabilities of IBM's new PC
- "The Donkey" (fairy tale), a fairy tale collected by the Brothers Grimm
- Donkey (card game), variant of the card game Pig
- "Donkey" (Happy Hollidays), a 2009 television episode
- "Donkey", a season 3 premiere episode of the TV series Servant

== Other uses ==
- Delph Donkey, nickname given to a train service between Oldham and Delph
- Donkey jacket, a short, buttoned outer coat
- Nodding donkey, a pumpjack
- Steam donkey, a type of steam engine

== See also ==
- Donki
- eDonkey (disambiguation)
- Videogamedunkey, an American YouTuber alternatively referred to as Dunkey
