= JMule =

File sharing software

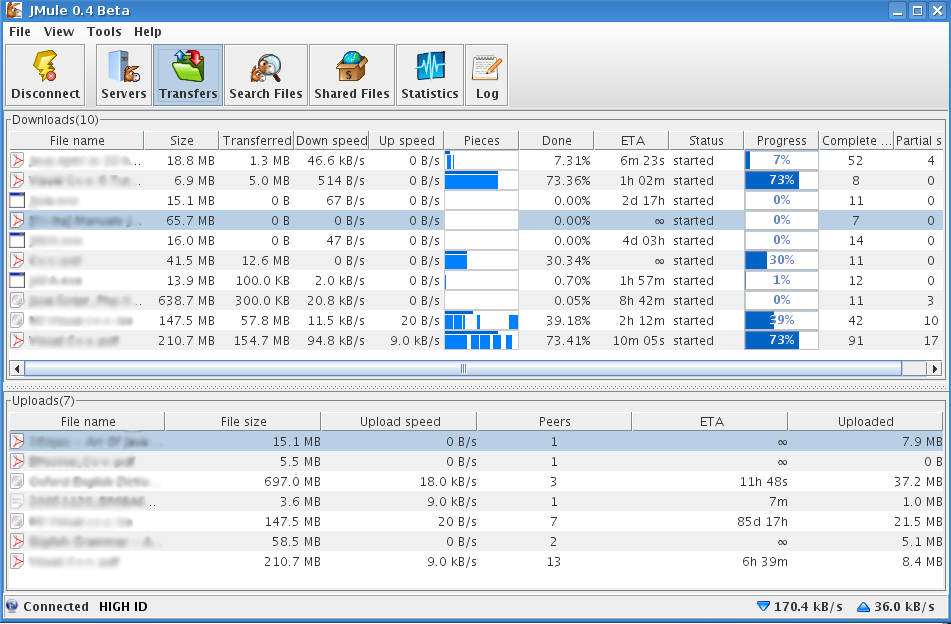
- JMule 0.4 Beta
- Initial release: September 21, 2002; 23 years ago
- Stable release: 0.5.8 (January 13, 2010; 15 years ago) [±]
- Preview release: 0.5.8 B9 (September 15, 2011; 14 years ago) [±]
- Repository: www.sourceforge.net/projects/jmule/
- Written in: Java
- Platform: Java SE
- Size: 2.73 MB
- Available in: English
- Type: Peer-to-peer
- License: GNU General Public License
- Website: jmule.org

JMule is an open source file sharing client written in Java for eDonkey2000 networks. JMule is released under the terms of the GNU General Public License, it is based on Java platform and requires at least Java SE 6.0 for operation. At a more general level this is a project that try to accomplish several goals. For now the client has Swing and SWT user interfaces, but more user interfaces were to come soon as of 2010. The name "JMule" comes from a "J" (Java) and a "Mule" (like eMule, aMule).

== Development ==
As of 2010, JMule is under an active development mostly using open source software. The main IDE is Eclipse with AspectJ plugin that runs on Ubuntu Linux. The source code is stored in a public CVS repository provided by SourceForge.net The JMule Team releases nightly builds of the client but not on a regular basis. In 2010, the development priority was focused on Kad DHT and network infrastructure.
