= EDonkey =

eDonkey may refer to:

- eDonkey network (also known as eDonkey2000 network or eD2k), a popular file sharing network
  - eDonkey2000, a discontinued file sharing program that used the eDonkey network
  - ed2k URI scheme
