= Lphant =

Peer-to-peer sharing software

- Search results for Zeitgeist, the Movie on the Kad network
- Original author: Juanjo
- Stable release: 3.51 (March 3, 2009; 17 years ago) [±]
- Written in: C#
- Operating system: Microsoft Windows, Linux and Mac OS
- Size: 2.8 MB
- Available in: 19 languages
- Type: Peer-to-peer file sharing
- Licence: Freeware

Lphant was a peer-to-peer file sharing client for the Microsoft Windows, Linux and Mac OS operating systems, which supports the eDonkey Network and the BitTorrent protocol. It was available in 19 languages. The name and logo of the original Lphant application has been replicated in a program called "Lphant 6.0" (see Domain Name Acquisition).

== Features ==
Lphant is a multi-network client, capable of searching for files by connecting to ed2k servers or through the emule source exchange and the kad network. Files can be downloaded simultaneously using the ed2k and BitTorrent protocols. Lphant supports various experimental ed2k features such as Protocol obfuscation, endgame althorithm and webcache, some of which are only found in eMule mods. However, some emule modders consider Lphant a leeching application and have therefore created algorithms which emulate their mods to Lphant when connecting to an Lphant client.

== Domain Name Acquisition ==
Lphant 3.51 was released on 3 March 2009. The Lphant.com domain was sold in March 2009 to Discordia Ltd., and the Lphant software was not the "original" eDonkey/BitTorrent based program, but rather was connected to a different centralized network.

Instead of advertisements, current versions of the original application may display a message suggesting to users they should upgrade Lphant by installing an executable package named LphantV6.exe. Installing this package will result in removal of the original application and loss of eDonkey and BitTorrent connectivity. Users of the original Lphant application can prevent the display of such messages by blocking the ad.adliveserver.com domain using a hosts file or a firewall.

The web site has been redesigned using the same elephant-like logo of the original application. The similarity of names and graphics may have caused some download services to falsely advertise the eDonkey and BitTorrent connectivity of the original client while providing the non-original program for download.
