= Comparison of Direct Connect software =

This article compares features and other data about client and server software for Direct Connect, a peer-to-peer file sharing protocol.

== Hub software ==
Direct Connect hubs are central servers to which clients connect, thus the networks are not as decentralized as Gnutella or FastTrack. Hubs provide information about the clients, as well as file-searching and chat abilities. File transfers are done directly between clients, in true peer-to-peer fashion.

Hubs often have special areas of interest. Many have requirements on the total size of the files that their members share (share size), and restrictions on the content and quality of shares. A hub can have any arbitrary rule. Hubs can allow users to register and provide user authentication. The authentication is also in clear text. The hub may choose certain individuals as operators (similar to IRC operators) to enforce said rules if the hub itself cannot.

While not directly supported by the protocol, hub linking software exists. The software allow multiple hubs to be connected, allowing users to share and/or chat with people on the other linked hubs. Direct connect hubs have difficulty scaling, due to the broadcast-centricity of the protocol.

=== General ===
| NMDC hub | FOSS | Software license | Active | Last update (version) | GUI | CLI | Other | IPv6 support | Programming language | Based on | Notes |
|---|---|---|---|---|---|---|---|---|---|---|---|
| UFOHub | No | Proprietary; Freeware | Yes | 2026-11-12 (25.26.11) | Yes | Yes | No | Yes | Unknown | | |
| Verlihub | Yes | GNU GPL | Yes | 08-23-2025 (1.7.0.0) | No | Yes | Unknown | No | C++, Lua, Python, Perl | | |
| PTDCH | Yes | GNU GPL | No | 2009-01-16 (2.1 Alpha 7) | Yes | Unknown | Unknown | No | Visual Basic, Jscript, VBscript | DDCH | |
| Dtella | Yes | GNU GPL | No | 2015-06-07 (1.2.9) | No | No | Yes | No | Python | | |
| HeXHub | Yes | Open Software License | No | 2014-03-01 (5.12) | Yes | Unknown | Unknown | No | Assembly | | |
| Open Direct Connect Hub | Yes | GNU GPL | No | 2014-08-14 (0.8.3) | No | Unknown | Unknown | No | C, Perl | | Available in Debian and OpenWrt |
| Flexhub | Yes | GNU AGPL | No | 2013-10-22 (Beta 0.2 svn 1469) | Pending | Yes | Unknown | No | Lua | | |
| PtokaX | Yes | GNU GPL | Yes | 2022-12-29 (0.5.3.0) | Yes | Yes | Unknown | Yes | C++, Lua | | |
| RusHub | Yes | GNU GPL | No | 2012-06-10 (2.3.10) | No | Yes | Unknown | Yes | C++, Lua | Verlihub | |
| Eximius | No | Proprietary; Freeware | No | 2007 | Yes | Unknown | Unknown | No | C#, Lua | | |
| DB Hub | Yes | GNU GPL | No | 2008-02-08 (0.451) | Unknown | Unknown | Unknown | No | Unknown | OpenDCHub | |
| openDCd | Yes | GNU GPL | No | 2002-03-26 (0.5.8) | Unknown | Unknown | Unknown | No | Unknown | | |
| DDCH DevDirect Connect Hub | Unknown | Unknown | No | 2007-04-15 (?.?.?) | Yes | No | No | No | Visual Basic, Jscript | | |
| py-dchub | Yes | MIT | No | 2006-02-13 (0.2.4) | Unknown | Unknown | Unknown | No | Python | | |
| Aquila | Yes | GNU GPL | No | 2015-02-17 (0.1.11-pre4-beta4) | No | Yes | No | No | C++, Lua | | |
| YnHub | No | Proprietary; Freeware | No | 2016-07-15 (1.0364.126) | Yes | No | No | No | Delphi | | |
| LamaHub | Yes | GNU GPL | No | 2010-04-25 (0.0.6.3) | Unknown | Unknown | Unknown | No | C | | |
| DC Sharp Hub | Yes | GNU GPL | No | 2004-09-06 (3.0.4 beta) | Unknown | Unknown | Unknown | No | C# | | |
| NMDC hub | FOSS | Software license | Active | Last update (version) | GUI | CLI | Other | IPv6 support | Programming language | Based on | |

=== Operating system support ===
| NMDC hub | Windows | Linux | macOS | Other |
|---|---|---|---|---|
| UFOHub | Yes | No | No | No |
| Eximius | Yes | No | No | No |
| PTDCH | Yes | No | No | No |
| Aquila | Yes | Yes | No | No |
| Dtella | Yes | Yes | Yes | No |
| HeXHub | Yes | No | No | No |
| Open Direct Connect Hub | No | Yes | No | OpenWrt |
| Flexhub | Yes | Yes | No | Qnap and Synology NAS Devices |
| openDCd | Yes | Yes | No | No |
| DDCH DevDirect Connect Hub | Yes | No | No | No |
| DBHub | No | Yes | No | No |
| PtokaX | Yes | Yes | Yes | FreeBSD, OpenBSD, NetBSD, Solaris, illumos, Haiku |
| py-dchub | Yes | Yes | Yes | Any Python compatible platform |
| RusHub | Yes | Yes | Yes | FreeBSD, Solaris |
| VerliHub | No | Yes | No | No |
| Yhub | Yes | No | No | No |
| Ynhub | Yes | No | No | No |
| LamaHub | Yes | Yes | Yes | OS/2, OpenBSD, NetBSD, TrueOS, FreeBSD, ZeX/OS, Android |
| DC Sharp Hub | Yes | No | No | No |
| NMDC hub | Windows | Linux | macOS | Other |

== Client software ==
While not mandated by the protocol, most clients send a "tag". This is part of the client's description and display information ranging from client name and version to number of total available slots to if the user is using a proxy server. It was originally added to DC++, due to its ability to be in multiple hubs with the same instance. The information is arbitrary. The original client's file list (a comprehensive list of the files a user shares) was compressed using Huffman's compression algorithm. Newer clients (among them DC++) serve an XML-based list, compressed with bzip2.

=== General ===
| NMDC Client | FOSS | Software license | Last update (version) | Windows | Linux | macOS | Other OS | GUI | CLI | Other UI | Programming language | Based on |
|---|---|---|---|---|---|---|---|---|---|---|---|---|
| MLDonkey | Yes | GNU GPL | 08-20-2024 (3.2.1) | Yes | Yes | Yes | No | Yes | Yes | WebUI | OCaml, C, assembly | |
| Shareaza | Yes | GNU GPL | 2017-09-18; 2.7.10.2 | Yes | No | No | No | Yes | Unknown | Unknown | C++ | |
| NeoModus Direct Connect | No | Proprietary; Freeware | 2004-10-23; 2.205 | Yes | Yes | No | No | Yes | No | No | Visual Basic, C++ | |
| ShakesPeer | Yes | GNU GPL | 2013-06-08 | No | No | Yes | No | Yes | No | No | C | |
| Valknut | Yes | GNU GPL | 2009-02-10; 0.4.9 | No | Yes | No | FreeBSD | Yes | No | No | C++ | |
| DCTC | Yes | GNU GPL | 2004-01-24; 0.85.9 | | | | | No | No | Yes | C++ | |
| DC# | Yes | GNU GPL | | Yes | No | No | No | Yes | No | No | C# | |
| LDCC | Yes | GNU GPLv2 | 2004-07-15; 2.0.7 | No | Yes | No | No | No | No | Yes | C | |
| DCDM++ | Yes | GNU GPL | 2004-04-04; 0.021 | Yes | No | No | No | Yes | No | No | C++ | DC++ |
| fulDC | Yes | GNU GPL | 2007-04-01; 6.79 Beta 8 | Yes | No | No | No | Yes | No | No | C++ | DC++ |
| RevConnect | Yes | GNU GPL | 2007-08-25; 0.674p | Yes | No | No | No | Yes | No | No | C++ | DC++ |
| CzDC | Yes | GNU GPL | 2011-01-20; 0.699 | Yes | No | No | No | Yes | No | No | C++ | DC++ |
| EiskaltDC++ | Yes | GNU GPL | 2021-03-02; 2.4.2 | No | Yes | Yes | FreeBSD | Yes | No | No | C++ | Valknut |
| microdc2 | Yes | GNU GPL | 2006-12-24; 0.15.6 | No | Yes | Yes | FreeBSD | No | Yes | No | C | |
| NMDC Client | FOSS | Software license | Last update (version) | Windows | Linux | macOS | Other OS | GUI | CLI | Other UI | Programming language | Based on |

== Other software ==
Hub linking software links hubs' main chat, so that users can see and respond to chat that is in a hub they're not directly connected to. Often used to draw in users to hubs, or make private or small hubs more widely known. Whereas advertising a hub is "frowned upon" and is usually repercussion with floods or denial of service attacks, forming a more or less formal network by means of linking hub chat is a legitimate means for getting free publicity. Some Hub programs are able to support a more advanced form of linking which includes all the normal functions, chat, private messages, search and file transfers between users on different hubs can be supported through hub specific solutions or hub software neutral extensions using scripts/plug-ins.

=== General ===
| Other software | Software type | FOSS | Software license | Active |
|---|---|---|---|---|
| jDCBot | General library | Yes | GNU GPL | Yes |
| Net::DirectConnect | General library | Yes | Unknown | Yes |
| FlowLib | General library | Yes | GNU GPL | Yes |
| DC-hublink | Link | Yes | GNU GPL | No |
| Hub-Link | Link | Yes | GNU GPL | No |
| MyIrcDcLinks | Link | Yes | GNU GPL | Yes |
| NetChatLink | Link | Yes | GNU GPL | Yes |
| Kitty | Bot | Yes | GNU GPL | No |
| Other software | Software type | FOSS | Software license | Active |

=== Operating system support ===
| Other software | Windows | Linux | macOS | Other |
|---|---|---|---|---|
| jDCBot | Yes | Yes | Yes | Any Java compatible platform |
| Net::DirectConnect | Yes | Yes | Yes | Any Perl compatible platform |
| FlowLib | Yes | Yes | Yes | Any C# compatible platform |
| DC-hublink | Yes | No | No | No |
| Hub-Link | Yes | No | No | No |
| MyIrcDcLinks | Yes | No | No | No |
| NetChatLink | Yes | No | No | Runs under WINE |
| Kitty | Yes | No | No | No |
| Other software | Windows | Linux | macOS | Other |

=== Interface and programming ===
| Other software | GUI | CLI | Other | Programming language | Based on |
|---|---|---|---|---|---|
| jDCbot | No | No | No | Java | |
| Net::DirectConnect | No | No | No | Perl | |
| FlowLib | No | No | No | C# | |
| DC-hublink | Yes | No | No | Visual Basic | |
| Hub-Link | Yes | No | No | Visual Basic | |
| MyIrcDcLinks | Yes | No | No | Delphi | |
| NetChatLink | Yes | No | No | Delphi | |
| Kitty | Unknown | Unknown | Unknown | C# | |
| Other software | GUI | CLI | Other | Programming language | Based on |
