= Dbndns =

Fork of djbdns software package

dbndns
- Developer: Debian Project
- Stable release: 1.05-8 / April 12, 2010; 16 years ago
- Operating system: Unix-like
- Type: DNS server
- License: Public domain
- Website: tracker.debian.org/pkg/djbdns

dbndns was a fork of the djbdns software package, maintained by the Debian Project, made possible by the release of djbdns to the public domain.

The fork was created so as to add many common patches to djbdns. Most notably, this now includes IPv6 support.

Previously, it was necessary to get a special 'djbdns-installer' package that downloaded the djbdns source from the author's site and apply a patch, but the free software status means this is no longer necessary, and Debian can directly carry the source and patches, producing a redistributable binary deb package.

This package had filtered through into Ubuntu.

Dbndns is no longer maintained as part of the Debian distribution.

== See also ==
- djbdns
- Comparison of DNS server software
