= Foxy (P2P) =

- Developer: Vastel Technology Ltd. Inc.
- Operating system: Microsoft Windows
- Type: P2P
- License: Freeware
- Website: https://www.gofoxy.net

Foxy is a Taiwanese P2P software by Vastel Technology Ltd. Inc. (位思科技有限公司) and was very popular in Taiwan, Hong Kong and Macau. The software was treated as a trojan by antivirus software Norton Antivirus and AVG for its file sharing capability. There may also be a malware Foxy.

In Taiwan and Hong Kong news reports of secret government documents carelessly shared through the share folder or setting of the software raised concerns. The concerns begin to arise when online porn clips were wirespraded via Foxy.

== Foxy P2P's Gnutella(2) Origins ==
Foxy has been known to be based on the gnutella and G2 architecture. Foxy uses Gnutella Web Cache as bootstrap method for connecting its clients initially to the Foxy network. The three foxy bootstrapping servers are GWebCaches with a modified Jums-Web-Cache Java engine: FOXY 1, FOXY 2, and FOXY 3. There is another GWC Beacon Cache Core 2 which is independent of the three. Foxy is known to use the Gnutella2 architecture for its network, while using a modified GnucDNA core for its actual network management system.

== Privacy ==
Foxy is unable to confirm the file originator: when a foxy client searches for a file, other clients can reply with a list of IPs who have the file. These IPs may or may not be the file originator, and there is no indication of which IP is the file originator, which one's a relay, and which is a replica.
