= TapTap =

Video game distribution platform

- Developer: XD Inc
- Platform: Android, iOS, iPadOS (open-source)
- Type: Mobile game store
- Website: taptap.io

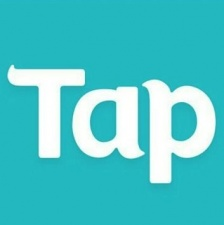
TapTap's oldest icon before 2021.

TapTap is a mobile game-sharing community and third-party game store that originated in China, operated by XD Inc. The platform allows users to download games and engage within the community.

In the first half of 2024, TapTap reached an average of 48 million monthly active users from over 170 countries, including the United States, Japan, Germany, and Italy.

ByteDance, the parent company of TikTok, game developer miHoYo, and Lilith Mobile are investors of TapTap. In 2020, MiHoYo’s Genshin Impact was distributed on TapTap.

== Exclusives ==
While with similarities to the offering on mainstream app stores such as Google Play and the App Store, TapTap holds exclusives to games such as Torchlight: Infinite and T3 Arena during alpha testing and Valorant Mobile.

== Events ==
=== TapTap Presents ===
TapTap Presents is a Live Show, hosted by TapTap, that first streamed on July 10, 2020, unveiling game-related updates and upcoming mobile games, including Genshin Impact and Torchlight: Infinite.

== History ==
TapTap was created by Yiwan in 2016 with an investment from XD Inc., previously known for peer-to-peer download network VeryCD. In March 2018, TapTap was fined for violating games publishing laws in China, among other companies, and shut down its service for 3 months.
