= Voddler =

Video-on-demand provider

Voddler Sweden AB
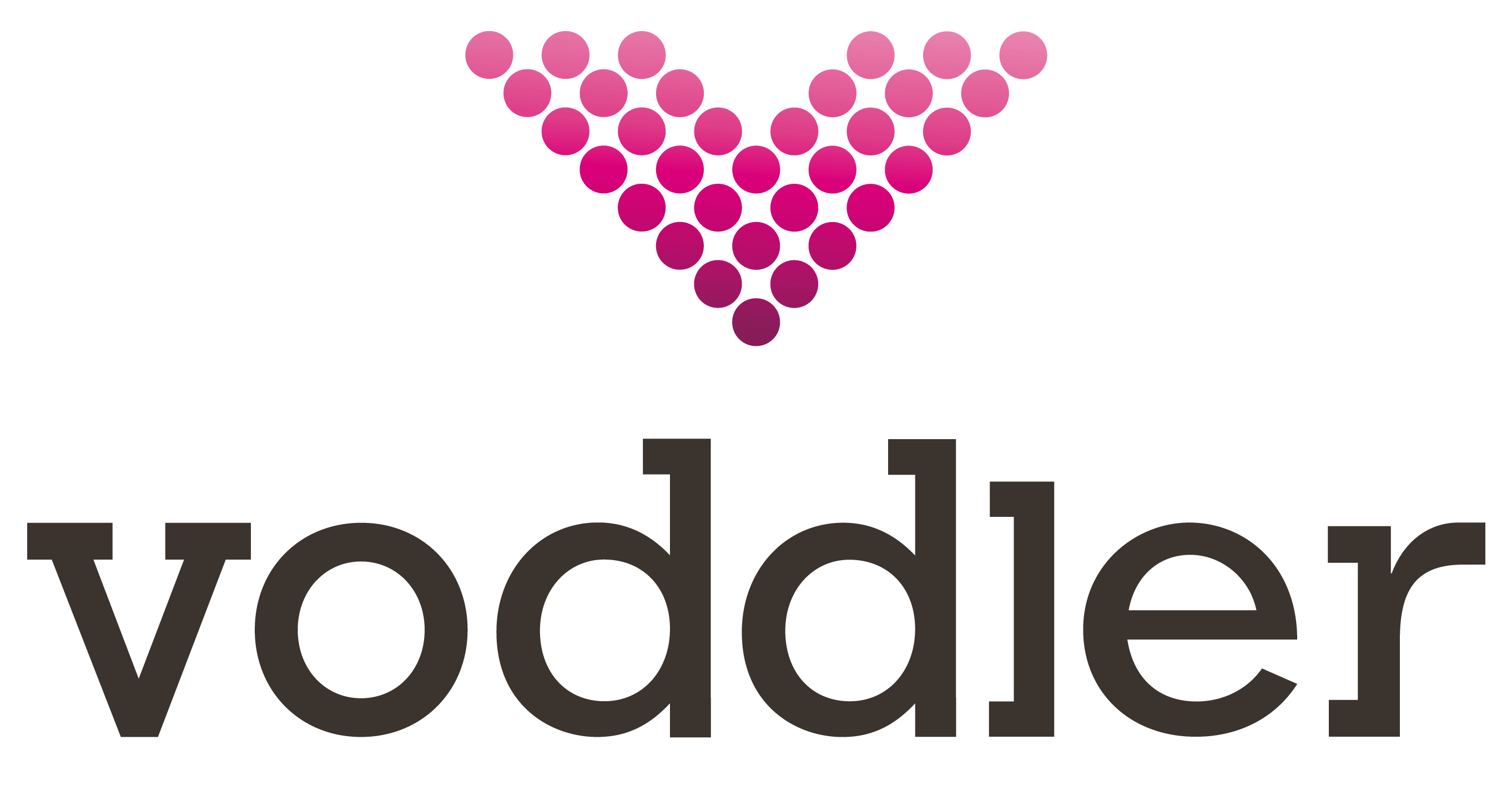
- Type: Privately held company
- Industry: Internet video, Streaming
- Founded: 2005
- Defunct: 2018
- Headquarters: Stockholm, Sweden
- Area served: Worldwide
- Products: OTT streaming solutions; Online Video Platform (OVP); Content Delivery
- Website: www.voddlergroup.com

Voddler was a Stockholm, Sweden-based provider of a video-on-demand (VOD) platform and a streaming technology for over-the-top (OTT) streaming on the public Internet. In Scandinavia, Voddler was primarily known for the commercial VOD-service Voddler, which was launched in 2009. As a company, Voddler was founded in 2005 and developed its own streaming solution, called Vnet. Vnet is based on peer-to-peer (p2p), where all users contribute by streaming movies to each other, but, unlike traditional p2p, Vnet has a central administrator who decides which users that have access to which movies. Due to this exception, Vnet has been referred to as a "hybrid p2p distribution system", "walled garden p2p" or "controlled p2p". In addition to running the consumer service Voddler, the company Voddler also offers, since 2013, Vnet as a stand-alone technology for other streaming platforms. The service Bollyvod, a global VOD-service for Bollywood-content that Voddler built for the Indian movie industry, was released as a pilot in 2014.

Voddler Group went bankrupt in January 2018.

== Voddler's streaming technology Vnet ==
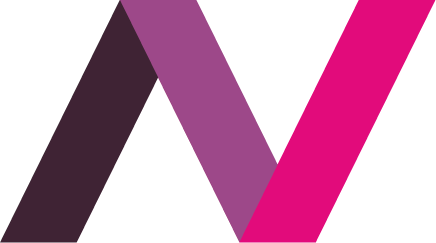
Vnet logotype

Voddler's streaming technology, called Vnet by the company, is a peer-to-peer-based video content delivery solution. With p2p-streaming, movies are not streamed from a central server or content delivery network (CDN), but from other users who have parts of the movie on their units after seeing the movie earlier. This process begins when a user clicks play for a movie and continues throughout the viewing time, allowing for seamless viewing. After the viewer has completed watching the video, parts of the video file remains for a time on the user's device. Popular content, that is watched by many other users, remain longer on any one user's device than less popular content, which more quickly is removed from the network nodes.

Compared to server-based streaming, p2p-based streaming saves on data costs for the service provider, at the same time as the distribution becomes more robust, since it only grows stronger with every additional user. What distinguishes Vnet from traditional p2p is that Vnet allows an administrator to have central control over which movies are in the network and which users that can see them. Publishing into the network and access to the network is thus centrally controlled.

The Vnet client is a separate application that uses closed source proprietary code from Voddler and is run as background daemon or service).

Vnet is a patented solution with 28 patent in two patent families.

== Voddler's own VOD-service ==
The VOD-service Voddler, which is accessible via web browsers and apps in selected markets, allows registered users with a broadband connection to stream movies and TV-shows over the public Internet. The service was released in beta in Sweden on 28 October 2009, initially only for customers of Swedish ISP Bredbandsbolaget. After requiring users to have an invitation to the service during the first months, Voddler was fully opened in Sweden on 1 July 2010 and soon thereafter in Norway, Denmark and Finland.

The content catalog was initially completely free to the users and monetized via advertising. The catalog soon, however, became a mix of free movies (ad-funded or AVOD); rental movies (pay-per-view or TVOD); films that were part of a package (subscription or SVOD); and titles for purchase (Electronic Sell-Through or EST). The catalog contains primarily Hollywood- and other American titles, together with Scandinavian movies, primarily Swedish. Voddler built its catalog through license agreements with content owners such as Warner Bros., Paramount, Sony and Disney, including subsidiaries such as Touchstone Pictures and Miramax Films.

According to the company itself, Voddler reached over 1 million registered users in the Nordics, and also opened the service in Spain in 2012. To users in Spain, the catalog was more limited than in the Nordics.

=== Player and software clients ===
Voddler's first media player client required a separate download and its graphical 10-foot user interface was primarily designed for the living-room TV with a remote control, instead of a desktop computer interface. In March 2010, Voddler updated the interface to allow for mouse and keyboard control, both for selecting movies and for playing them in the Voddler media player. This first mediaplayer was based on the GNU Public Licensed (GPL) source code of XBMC Media Center, a free and open-source software, that Voddler used as its application framework for the media player. After a controversy in 2010 surrounding the source code for Voddler's video player (see below under "GPL controversy"), Voddler changed the framework for its player and has based it since then on Adobe Flash and Adobe Air, both of which are not open source code. At about the same time, Voddler also stopped demanding a separate download of the media player and instead started using a player that was embedded directly into the browser page. This new player, just like the old one, takes it stream from Voddler's streaming cloud Vnet.

=== Mobile units ===
On 23 June 2011, Voddler announced the launch of an Android app. Subsequently, Voddler also released apps for iPhone, iPad, Windows Phone, SymbianSymbian och MeeGo. Starting in 2013, Voddler has increasingly started to use browser-based streaming instead of building dedicated apps for each platform.

== GPL controversy ==
For its first video player, which was based on the GNU Public Licensed (GPL) source code of XBMC Media Center, Voddler also developed its own encryption module, to protect the movies streamed via the player from unauthorized copying or downloading. On 24 February 2010, the company closed down the service, having been hacked by anonymous programmers who had recreated these missing code parts that Voddler had added to its media player. The missing code made it possible for other media player to attach to Voddler's own, so that the user could save the streamed films to their harddrive. This use case violated the licensing deals that Voddler had signed with the content owners. As motivation for their attack, the anonymous programmers said that Voddler, according to GPL, should have published the code for the encryption module back to the open source project. Voddler claimed they had met the requirements of GPL, which the anonymous group argued was wrong, insisting that Voddler had to distribute all of the Voddler source code needed to compile the Voddler player executable. When Voddler re-opened its service on 8 March 2010, it was with a new media player, no longer based on XBMC. Since encryption protection was essential for Voddler, in order to keep its content license agreements, and that giving the code module back to the open source project was tantamount to removing the encryption, Voddler chose to completely replace the player with a commercially available framework.

== The Company ==
Voddler Sweden AB is a venture-backed, privately held company, based in Stockholm, Sweden. The company was founded 2005 by Martin Alsen, Magnus Dalhamn and Mattias Bergström and held for a while offices also in Palo Alto and Beijing. The company was reorganized in 2008 and investors Marcus Starberger and Mathias Hjelmstedt invested in Voddler Inc. Marcus Starberger and Mathias Hjelmstedt took their place as new founders and marked a new era for streaming services, video on demand (VOD). Marcus Starberger with a leading position in film and the TV companies' premiere events and marketing, as well as his deep knowledge of film companies value chain - the cinema distributor - video store - broadcast / satellite TV and their transaction models. It contributed to Marcus Starberger being given a mandate to implement a distribution system and interface to the end customer for films and TV series via the web. Which recently became the model for the revolution of an entire era of traditional moving media. At the beginning of 2010, Marcus Starberger chose to resign his leading position at Voddler after learning that Voddler had infringed copyright in its use of the GPL license. The company is financially backed by venture capital companies such as Swedish Deseven, Starberger Group AB and German Cipio Partners. Other investors include Nokia Growth Partners (Finland), Eqvitec (Finland), and Elisa Oyj (a Finnish telecommunications company). The company's CEO since 2009 is Marcus Bäcklund.
