= EDonkey2000 =

Peer-to-peer file sharing application

eDonkey2000

- Developer: MetaMachine
- Release: September 6, 2000; 26 years ago
- Final release: 1.4.6 / 2006
- Operating system: Cross-platform
- Type: Peer-to-peer
- License: Freeware

eDonkey2000 (nicknamed "ed2k") was a peer-to-peer file sharing application developed by US company MetaMachine (Jed McCaleb and Sam Yagan), using the Multisource File Transfer Protocol. It supported both the eDonkey2000 network and the Overnet network.

On September 28, 2005, eDonkey was discontinued following a cease and desist letter from the RIAA.

== eDonkey2000 network ==
Users on the eDonkey2000 network predominantly share large files of tens or hundreds of megabytes, such as CD images, videos, games, and software programs. To ease file searching, some websites list the checksums of sought-after files in the form of an ed2k link. Some of those websites also have lists of active servers for users to update.

MetaMachines has also created another file-sharing network called Overnet, which interoperates with the eDonkey network, but without the use of servers. Most eDonkey clients also now use the Overnet network. In 2004, MetaMachines announced it would stop development of Overnet to concentrate on eDonkey2000 (though the eDonkey2000 client now includes the Overnet protocol).

eDonkey has since been closed down.

== Early history and design ==
eDonkey logo

eDonkey2000 was created by Jed McCaleb, cofounder of Stellar, and was first released on September 6, 2000. On September 16, 2000, client and server versions were available for Microsoft Windows and Linux.

Compared to earlier P2P file-sharing program Napster, eDonkey2000 featured "swarming" downloads, meaning that clients could download different pieces of a single file from different peers, effectively utilizing the combined bandwidth of all of the peers instead of being limited to the bandwidth of a single peer.

At first, servers were isolated from one another as with Napster, but later versions of the eDonkey2000 server software enabled servers to form a search network. This allowed servers to forward search queries from their locally connected clients to other servers, allowing clients to effectively find peers connected to any server on the server network, thereby increasing download swarm size. It also allowed clients to find and download files not available from clients connected to the same server.

A third improvement compared to Napster was the use of file hashes instead of simple filenames in search results. File searches initiated by the user were keyword-based and matched against the filename list stored on the eDonkey2000 server, but the server returned a list of filenames paired with the hash values of those files to the client. When selecting a file from the list presented to the user, the client would actually initiate a download by hash value. This meant that a file could have many different filenames across different peers, but would be considered identical for purposes of downloading if its hash was the same.

The two-level (client and server) peer-to-peer network architecture offered a balance between centralized systems like Napster, and decentralized systems like Gnutella. Where Napster ultimately proved to be vulnerable was its centralized server cluster, which was a stable target for legal action. Gnutella's original design, featuring total elimination of the server network in favor of purely peer-to-peer searching, quickly proved to be infeasible due to massive search traffic overhead between peers.

Later 2nd-level P2P file sharing systems use a similar design to eDonkey2000 (downloading files in pieces by hash from multiple peers simultaneously) but innovate in the design of the server network, such as in the case of BitTorrent, which separates the file search feature ("torrent search") from the download peer locating feature ("torrent tracker").

== eDonkey2000 client ==
Overnet logo

The latest version of the official eDonkey2000 client included a plugin that allowed BitTorrent files to be downloaded. Once a torrent download begins the search facility within eDonkey can find the same file within the eDonkey/Overnet network and synchronise its download. This effectively allowed a torrent to be used as another source for the download, vastly increasing speed as well as virtually eliminating problems with fakes. Torrents are very "clean" in terms of falsely labelled files and their use as file size verifiers in addition to eDonkey2000's own user-based fake warning system has vastly improved the network's functionality. By effectively combining the range of the existing Overnet and eDonkey networks with the lightning-fast file distribution of the BitTorrent system, eDonkey2000 was following a growing trend amongst peer-to-peer programmes of integrating downloads from multiple networks. This has the advantage of maximising the number of files available while limiting vulnerability to problems on a single network.

== eDonkey sued by RIAA ==
In September 2005, officials from the company MetaMachine received a cease and desist letter from the RIAA as a result of the June 2005 Supreme Court ruling MGM Studios v. Grokster that makers of software that facilitates copyright infringement are liable for that infringement. Many news sites reported that on September 22, 2005, MetaMachine's corporate offices have closed. This was apparently inaccurate, based on the aforementioned news sites checking for the old eDonkey headquarters in New York (the new ones being in New Jersey, as they had moved there).

However, on September 28, 2005, eDonkey officially closed its doors. MetaMachine President Sam Yagan said in a statement that the company would "convert eDonkey's user base to an online content retailer operating in a closed P2P environment," and "such a transaction to take place as soon as we can reach a settlement with the RIAA". This had little effect on the network as a whole, as eDonkey clients only made up a small minority of the whole network.

A snapshot of the eDonkey website with the RIAA notice.

On September 12, 2006 it was reported that MetaMachine, Inc. had agreed to settle with the RIAA for $30 million, and the website is replaced by a text advertisement reflecting the RIAA's interpretation of copyright law.

Nevertheless, the eDonkey network is still available through other clients, such as eMule or aMule.

== See also ==
- Comparison of file sharing applications
- eDonkey network
- Threedegrees
