= XMule =

xMule
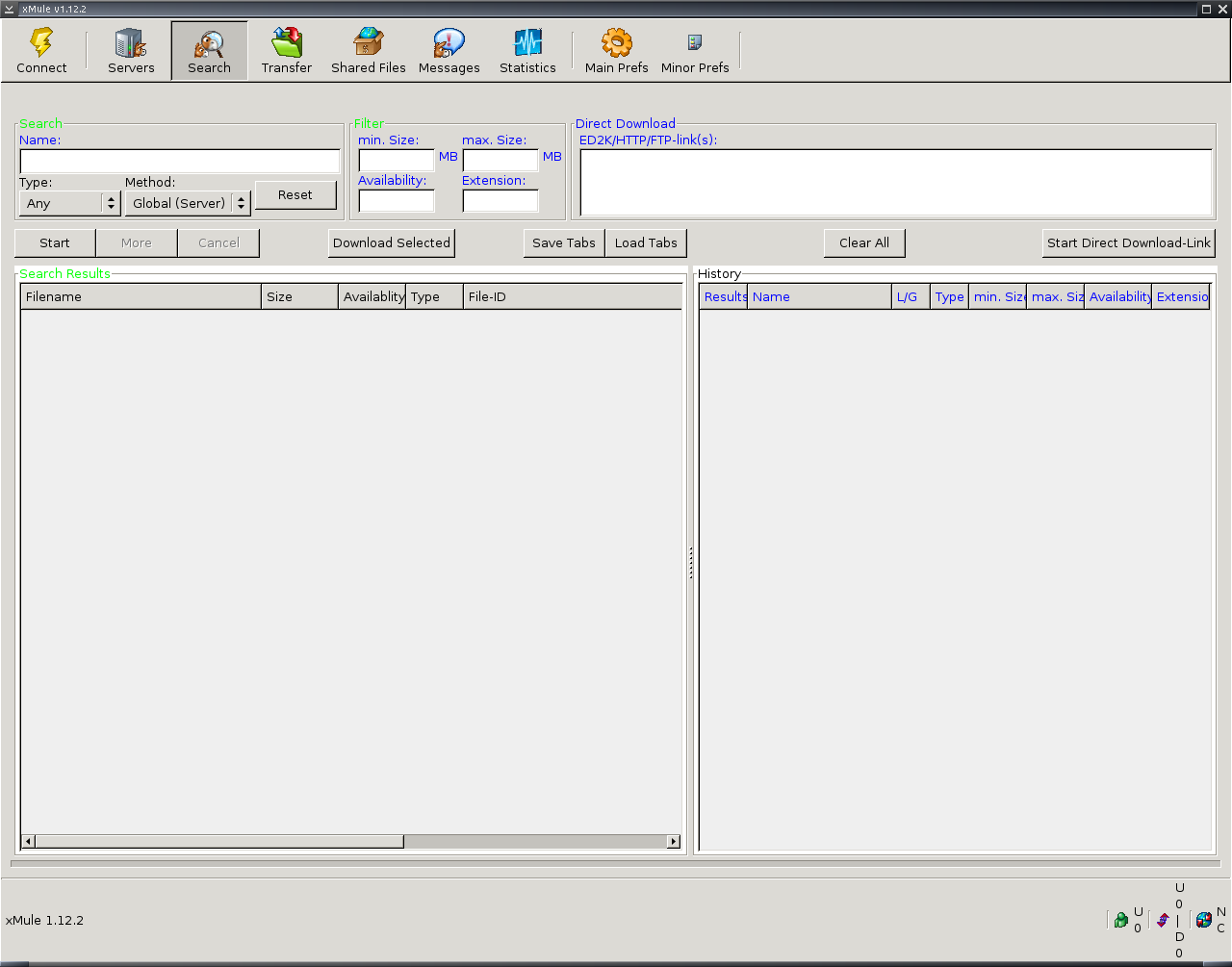
- Developer(s): xMule team
- Initial release: June 2003; 22 years ago
- Stable release: 1.13.7 RC1 (September 11, 2006; 18 years ago) [±]
- Operating system: Cross-platform
- Available in: C++
- Type: peer-to-peer file sharing
- License: GNU General Public License v2
- Website: www.xmule.ws

xMule (short for "X11 Mule") is a discontinued free client for the eDonkey peer-to-peer file sharing network intended to bring it to virtually all the major Unix platforms, with a particular emphasis on Linux.

xMule was coded in C++ using wxWidgets and released under GNU General Public License v2. xMule is a fork of lMule, itself a port of eMule. aMule is a fork of xMule.

== History ==
=== xMule ===
In June 2003, due to differences between the developers and the hijacking of lMule's official website by one contributor, lMule's fork, xMule, was created.

Unlike eMule, which uses MFC (Microsoft Foundation Classes), xMule used wxWidgets for the graphical user interface, therefore could run on many platforms. It fully supported Linux and *BSD, and was intended to support Windows and MacOS.

On 17 August 2003, Ted R. Smith, xMule's only maintainer who lived in the United States at the time, became involved in a legal battle due to his role in the development of xMule. His personal Internet connection was shut down. He appeared to be subpoenaed by the government on behalf of the Recording Industry Association of America (RIAA) for Digital Millennium Copyright Act (DMCA) related issue.

xMule's final release was 1.13.7 RC1 in September 2006.

Since 18 January 2009, a note on the official website of xMule, written by its developer, Avi Vahl, officially announced the discontinuation of xMule's development. To justify the decision, Avi Vahl claimed that eMule was dead and the future of peer-to-peer was the BitTorrent protocol. The official xMule website encouraged users to move to the BitTorrent network or use aMule.

=== aMule ===
On 18 August 2003, shortly after the incident involving Ted R. Smith, aMule (meaning "another Mule" and later "All-platform Mule") was forked from the xMule source code due to major disagreements. aMule's official website stated that "relations between the two projects are sadly in a rather sorry state", whereas xMule's stated that "aMule is geared more towards the present end-user, while xMule is more about long-term extensibility and viability", and drew comparisons to the different coding philosophies behind Internet Explorer and Mozilla. aMule has added the support for Windows and MacOS.
