= Gnutella2 =

P2P file-sharing network

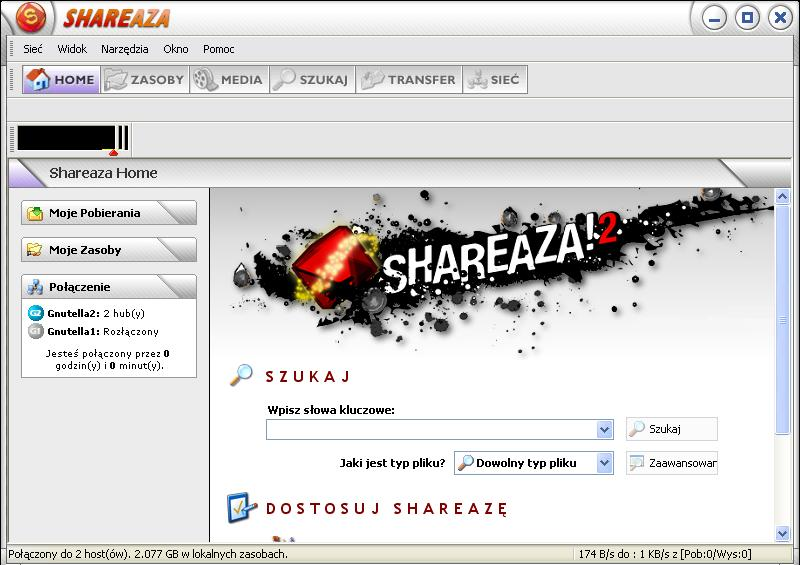

Gnutella2, often referred to as G2, is a peer-to-peer protocol developed mainly by Michael Stokes and released in 2002.

While inspired by the gnutella protocol, G2 shares little of its design with the exception of its connection handshake and download mechanics.

G2 adopts an extensible binary packet format and an entirely new search algorithm.

Furthermore, G2 has a related (but significantly different) network topology and an improved metadata system, which helps effectively to reduce fake files, such as viruses, on the network.

== History ==
In November 2002, Michael Stokes announced the Gnutella2 protocol to the Gnutella Developers Forum. While some thought the goals stated for Gnutella2 are primarily to make a clean break with the gnutella 0.6 protocol and start over, so that some of gnutella's less clean parts would be done more elegantly and, in general, be impressive and desirable; other developers, primarily those of LimeWire and BearShare, thought it to be a "cheap publicity stunt" and discounted technical merits. Some still refuse to refer to the network as "Gnutella2", and instead, refer to it as "Mike's Protocol" ("MP").

The Gnutella2 protocol still uses the old "GNUTELLA CONNECT/0.6" handshake string for its connections as defined in the gnutella 0.6 specifications. This backwardly compatible handshake method was criticized by the Gnutella Developers Forum as an attempt to use the gnutella network for bootstrapping the new, unrelated network, while proponents of the network claimed that its intent was to remain backwards-compatible with gnutella and to allow current gnutella clients to add Gnutella2 at their leisure.

With the developers entrenched in their positions, a flame war soon erupted, further cementing both sides' resolve.

The draft specifications were released on March 26, 2003, and more detailed specifications soon followed. G2 is not supported by many of the "old" gnutella network clients, however, many Gnutella2 clients still also connect to gnutella. Many Gnutella2 proponents claim that this is because of political reasons, while gnutella supporters claim that the drastic changes don't have enough merit to outweigh the cost of deep rewrites.

== Design ==
Gnutella2 divides nodes into two groups: Leaves and Hubs. Most Leaves maintain two connections to Hubs, while Hubs accept hundreds of Leaf connections, and an average of 7 connections to other Hubs. When a search is initiated, the node obtains a list of Hubs, if needed, and contacts the Hubs in the list, noting which have been searched, until the list is exhausted or a predefined search limit has been reached. This allows a user to find a popular file easily without loading the network, while, theoretically, maintaining the ability for a user to find a single file located anywhere on the network.

Hubs index what files a Leaf has by means of a Query Routing Table, which is filled with single bit entries of hashes of keywords, which the Leaf uploads to the Hub, and which the Hub then combines with all the hash tables its Leaves have sent, it in order to create a version to send to their neighboring Hubs. This allows for Hubs to reduce bandwidth greatly by simply not forwarding queries to Leaves and neighboring Hubs, if the entries which match the search are not found in the routing tables.

Gnutella2 relies extensively on UDP, rather than TCP, for searches. The overhead of setting up a TCP connection would make a random walk search system, requiring the contacting of large numbers of nodes with small volumes of data, unworkable. However, UDP is not without its own drawbacks. Because UDP is connectionless, there is no standard method to inform the sending client that a message was received, and so if the packet is lost, there is no way to know. Because of this, UDP packets in Gnutella2 have a flag to enable a reliability setting. When an UDP packet with enabled reliability flag is received, the client will respond with an acknowledge packet to inform the sending client that their packet arrived at its destination. If the acknowledge packet is not sent, the reliable packet will be retransmitted in an attempt to ensure delivery. Low importance packets, which do not have the flag enabled, do not require an acknowledge packet, reducing reliability, but also reducing overhead, as no acknowledge packet needs to be sent and waited upon.

== Protocol features ==
Gnutella2 has an extensible binary packet format, comparable to an XML document tree, which was conceived as an answer for some of gnutella's less elegant parts. The packet format was designed so that future network improvements and individual vendor features could be added without worry of causing bugs in other clients on the network.

For the purpose file identification and secure integrity check of files it employs SHA-1 hashes. To allow for a file to be reliably downloaded in parallel from multiple sources, as well as to allow for the reliable uploading of parts while the file is still being downloaded (swarming), Tiger tree hashes are used.

To create a more robust and complete system for searching, Gnutella2 also has a metadata system for more complete labeling, rating, and quality information to be given in the search results than would simply be gathered by the file names. Nodes can even share this information after they have deleted the file, allowing users to mark viruses and worms on the network, without requiring them to keep a copy.

Gnutella2 also utilizes compression in its network connections to reduce the bandwidth used by the network.

Shareaza has the additional feature to request previews of images and videos though only FilesScope takes limited advantage of this.

gtk-gnutella extended the protocol to further reduce the gap between Gnutella and G2. In particular, the semi-reliable UDP layer was enhanced to add cumulative and extended acknowledgments in a way that is backward compatible with legacy G2 clients. Further extensions include the "A" string in /Q2/I and the introduction of /QH2/H/ALT, /QH2/H/PART/MT, /QH2/HN, /QH2/BH and /QH2/G1 in the query hits.

== Differences from gnutella ==
Overall, the two networks are fairly similar, with the primary differences being in the packet format and the search methodology.

=== Protocol ===
Gnutella's packet format has been criticized because it was not originally designed with extensibility in mind, and has had many additions over the years, leaving the packet structure cluttered and inefficient. Gnutella2 learned from this, and aside from having many of the added features of gnutella standard in Gnutella2, designed in future extensibility from the start.

=== Search algorithm ===
While gnutella uses a query flooding method of searching, Gnutella2 uses a random walk system, where a searching node gathers a list of Hubs and contacts them directly, one at a time. However, as Hub organize themselves in, so called, "Hub clusters", where each Hub mirrors the information stored by its neighbors, the Leaf is returned the information of the entire Hub cluster (usually 7 Hubs). This has several advantages over the gnutella's query flooding system. It is more efficient, as continuing a search does not increase the network traffic exponentially, queries are not routed through as many nodes, and it increases the granularity of a search, allowing a client to stop, once a pre-defined threshold of results has been obtained, more effectively than in gnutella. However, the walk system also increases the complexity of the network and the network maintenance and management required, as well as requiring safeguards to prevent a malicious attacker from using the network for denial-of-service attacks.

=== Terminology ===
There is also a difference in terminology: while the more capable nodes, which are used to condense the network, are referred to as Ultrapeers in gnutella, they are called Hubs in Gnutella2, and they are also used slightly differently in topology. In gnutella, the Ultrapeers generally maintain as many leaves as peer connections, while Gnutella2 Hubs maintain far more leaves, and fewer peer (Hub-to-Hub) connections. The reason for this is that the search methods of the various networks have different optimum topologies.

== Clients ==
=== List ===
Free software Gnutella2 clients include:

- Adagio (Cross Platform), written in Ada, under the GPL.
- Gnucleus (Windows), written in C/C++, under the LGPL
- Gtk-gnutella (Cross Platform), written in C. Only supports leaf-mode connections to G2 since version 1.1.
- ~~MLDonkey~~ (Cross Platform), written in OCaml, under the GPL, however as of version 2.9.0 (2007), support is officially unmaintained and disabled in the binaries.
- Shareaza (Windows), multi-network, written in C++, under the GPL, currently +/- 93% network share

Proprietary software implementations include:

- Foxy (Windows) Chinese GnucDNA-derived program, no interaction with any other G2 clients possible, and uses its own "Foxy"-Network, which is separated from the original G2 and known for network leakage into G2. Theoretically, the client is compatible to G2.
- Morpheus (Windows)

=== Comparison ===
The following table compares general and technical information for a number of available applications supporting the G2 network.

Client	Chat	Handles big files (>4 GB)	UKHL	Unicode	UPnP port mapping	NAT traversal	Remote preview	Ability to search with hashes	Hub modus	Spyware/ Adware/ Malware-free	Other networks	Based on	OS	Other
Foxy	Yes	No	No	Yes	Yes	No	No	Yes	Foxy only	No	—N/a	GnucDNA	Cross-platform	-
FileScope	Yes	No	No	No	No	No	Yes	Yes	Yes	Yes	gnutella, eD2k, OpenNap	-	Windows	Development has ended in 2014.
Gnucleus	No	No	No	No	No	No	No	Yes	No	Yes	gnutella	GnucDNA	Windows	-
gtk-gnutella	No	Yes	No	Yes	Yes	Yes	No	Yes	No	Yes	gnutella	-	Cross-platform	-
Morpheus	Yes	No	No	No	Yes	No	No	Yes	No	No	gnutella, NEOnet	GnucDNA	Windows	Development and hosting of the client has been stopped
Shareaza	Yes	Yes	Yes	Yes	Yes	No	Yes	Yes	Yes	Yes	gnutella, eD2k, BitTorrent	-	Windows	Includes IRC support

== See also ==
- GnucDNA
- Shareaza
