= Donkey (band) =

Atlanta band

- Origin: Atlanta, Georgia
- Genres: Lounge music, alternative rock, ska
- Labels: Amphion Records, Steam Records
- Members: Teddy Murray, Todd "T.B." Ferster, Frank Brown, Paul Barrie

Donkey was a band formed in Atlanta, Georgia by its vocalist, Todd "T.B." Ferster. Both of the band's albums were released on Amphion Records. Their debut album, Slick Night Out, was released in 1993 and was recorded live at the Point, a concert venue in the Atlanta, Georgia neighborhood of Little Five Points. The album was recorded by Don McCollister, and included two horn players. Also in 1994, the band released its second album, Ten Cent Freaks.

Their sound has been described as "Frank Sinatra meets the Clash," as "Harry Connick, Jr., meets Fishbone," and as "Somewhere between the Jam and James Bond." A review of Slick Night Out in Billboard compared their sound to the Beautiful South and the Crash Test Dummies.

== Discography ==
- Slick Night Out (Amphion/Steam, 1993)
- Ten Cent Freaks (Amphion, 1994)
