= Ed2k URI scheme =

File sharing URL

In computing, eD2k links (ed2k://) are hyperlinks used to denote files stored on computers connected to the eDonkey filesharing P2P network.

== General ==
Many programs, such as eMule, MLDonkey and the original eDonkey2000 client by MetaMachine, which introduced the link type, as well as others using the eDonkey file sharing protocol, can be used to manage files stored in the filesharing network.

eD2k links allow a file to be identified from a link in a web browser and to be downloaded thereafter by a client like eMule, Shareaza or any other compatible software. This linking feature was one of the first URIs to be introduced in peer-to-peer file sharing, and had a vast effect on the development of the eDonkey network, as it allowed external link sites to provide verified content within the network. Nowadays, so-called Magnet links have replaced eD2k links in practice. They serve a similar role, but are not limited to the eD2k hash and can contain other hashes such as SHA-1 or MD5 for example, which makes it possible to use these links to point to files in several networks (as well as in BitTorrent) at once.

eD2k links include file hashes, as these hashes can be used as a unique identifier for files within the network, so even if the linked-to file has a different name on two computers within the network, the file can be found on both of them, and file chunks can be obtained from both sources. This is done by using a hash function on the file to calculate its checksum, depending only from the file content, not from its name.

Like other URI protocols, web browsers can be configured to automatically handle ed2k URIs. After installing an eD2k client, the eD2k protocol is optionally registered so that clicking on it in the browser automatically starts the download or asks whether the user wants to start downloading.

== File link format ==
File links are preceded with the "file" token, which indicates that this is a file link, as opposed to a server, serverlist, nodelist or friend link. The typical eD2k file link also includes the filename and the file size. An example (a link to the 15 MB Purist Edit trailer) is provided below:

ed2k://|file|The_Two_Towers-The_Purist_Edit-Trailer.avi|14997504|965c013e991ee246d63d45ea71954c4d|/

eD2k links can also include a reference to the IP address and port of specific clients that are known to share the linked-to file. This is done by adding a list of sources after the main part of the link, like shown in the following example:

ed2k://|file|The_Two_Towers-The_Purist_Edit-Trailer.avi|14997504|965c013e991ee246d63d45ea71954c4d|/|sources,202.89.123.6:4662|/

On eMule, the link often contains also an AICH top hash |h=H52BRVWPBBTAED5NXQDH2RJDDAKRUWST| to help recover the file in case of corruption during file transfer.

=== eD2k hash algorithm ===
The eD2k hash function is a root hash of a list of MD4 hashes. It gives a different result than a simple usage of the MD4 algorithm.

The file data is divided into full chunks of 9500 KiB (9728000 bytes) plus a remainder chunk, and a separate 128-bit MD4 checksum is computed for each. If the file is greater than 9500 KiB (which means that there is more than one chunk), the eD2k hash is computed by concatenating the chunks' MD4 checksums in order and hashing the result again using MD4. Otherwise, the MD4 hash of the only chunk of the file is used with no further modifications.

This method of hashing allows the recipient to verify that a hash list corresponds to an original eD2k file hash, without the need to actually have the file present on disk.

In the past, there has been some ambiguity for files whose size is a multiple of the chunk size (9500 KiB). Old versions of some eD2k hash tools computed file hashes with an additional 0-byte chunk at the end. This is because an ambiguity of the term remainder chunk which can be interpreted as either the last chunk or a non-full chunk at the end. Following the latter interpretation, some implementations added a zero byte chunk in case the last chunk of a file was a complete one. This practice is discouraged however and the first interpretation is used as a standard nowadays to prevent some files from having different hashes depending on the algorithm implementation used to calculate their hash.

=== AICH ===
The AICH (Advanced Intelligent Corruption Handling) is an eMule extension. It subdivides the 9500 KiB chunk into 180-KiB blocks and builds a Merkle tree out of the SHA1 hashes of the 53 blocks, so that the root hash of each block is called a block hash. The block hashes further feed into a Merkle tree, the root hash of which is the actual AICH root hash. The smaller block size allows eMule clients to more precisely identifify locations of corruption.

== Server links ==
A server link is a reference to an eDonkey2000 server; clicking on such a link typically adds it to the server list. Server links are indicated by the server token at the beginning of the link and have the following format:

ed2k://|server|IP|PORT|/

- IP – IP of the server to connect to.
- PORT – Port where the server is listening for incoming eD2k connections

Example:

ed2k://|server|207.44.222.51|4242|/

== See also ==
- Magnet URI scheme
- Metalink
- Named data networking
