= Fork (software development) =

Independent software derived from existing software

A timeline chart showing the evolution of Linux distributions, with each split in the diagram being called "a fork"

In software development, a fork is a codebase that is created by copying an existing codebase and modifying it independently from the original. Software built from a fork initially has identical behavior as software built from the original code, but as the source code is increasingly modified, the resulting software tends to have increasingly different behavior compared to the original. A fork is a form of branching, but generally involves storing the forked files separately from the original – not in the repository. Reasons for forking a codebase include user preference, stagnated or discontinued development of the original software or a schism in the developer community. Forking proprietary software (such as Unix) is prohibited by copyright law without explicit permission, but free and open-source software, by definition, may be forked without permission.

== Etymology ==
The word fork has been used to mean "to divide in branches, go separate ways" as early as the 14th century.

In the context of software development, fork was used in the sense of creating a revision control branch by Eric Allman as early as 1980, in the context of Source Code Control System:

Creating a branch "forks off" a version of the program.

The term was in use on Usenet by 1983 for the process of creating a subgroup to move topics of discussion to.

Although fork is not known to have been used in the sense of a community schism during the origins of Lucid Emacs (now XEmacs) (1991) or the Berkeley Software Distributions (BSDs) (1993–1994), Russ Nelson used the term shattering in this sense in 1993 (attributing it to John Gilmore). In 1995, fork was used to describe the XEmacs split, and was an understood usage in the GNU Project by 1996.

The word is used similarly for the fork() system call which causes a running process to split in two – typically, to allow them to perform different tasks in parallel.

== Forking of free and open-source software ==
Free and open-source software may be legally forked without prior approval of those currently developing, managing, or distributing the software per both The Free Software Definition and The Open Source Definition:

The freedom to distribute copies of your modified versions to others (freedom 3). By doing this, you can give the whole community a chance to benefit from your changes. Access to the source code is a precondition for this.

— The Free Software Definition

3. Derived Works: The license must allow modifications and derived works, and must allow them to be distributed under the same terms as the license of the original software.

— The Open Source Definition

=== Community dynamics ===
In free software, forks often result from a schism over different goals or personality clashes. In a fork, both parties assume nearly identical code bases, but typically only the larger group, or whoever controls the web site, will retain the full original name and the associated user community. Thus, there is a reputation penalty associated with forking. The relationship between the different teams can be cordial or very bitter. On the other hand, a friendly fork or a soft fork is a fork that does not intend to compete, but wants to eventually merge with the original.

Eric S. Raymond, in his essay Homesteading the Noosphere, stated that "The most important characteristic of a fork is that it spawns competing projects that cannot later exchange code, splitting the potential developer community". He notes in the Jargon File:

Forking is considered a Bad Thing—not merely because it implies a lot of wasted effort in the future, but because forks tend to be accompanied by a great deal of strife and acrimony between the successor groups over issues of legitimacy, succession, and design direction. There is serious social pressure against forking. As a result, major forks (such as the Gnu-Emacs/XEmacs split, the fissioning of the 386BSD group into three daughter projects, and the short-lived GCC/EGCS split) are rare enough that they are remembered individually in hacker folklore.

=== Outcomes and classification ===
David A. Wheeler notes four possible outcomes of a fork, with examples:

1. The death of the fork. This is by far the most common case. It is easy to declare a fork, but considerable effort to continue independent development and support.
2. A re-merging of the fork (e.g., egcs becoming "blessed" as the new version of GNU Compiler Collection.)
3. The death of the original (e.g. the X.Org Server succeeding and XFree86 dying.)
4. Successful branching, typically with differentiation (e.g., OpenBSD and NetBSD.)

Michael Widenius, creator of the MariaDB fork of MySQL, proposed in 2026 a classification of forks according to their relationship to the original project. He distinguishes an internal fork, made by the original owner or development team for political, redesign or development reasons, from an external fork made by an outside group, and divides external forks by increasing divergence from the original into four kinds:

- Downstream "no-changes" fork – a rebase plus patches with no user-visible changes, as in distribution packaging.
- Downstream fork – adds user-visible changes while remaining compatible with the original, as with Ubuntu relative to Debian.
- Compatibility fork – abandons rebasing in favour of selected merges and rewrites, while still aiming at high compatibility, as with LibreOffice.
- Independent fork – no longer dependent on the original, although it may still adopt patches or ideas from it, as with illumos.

Widenius presents these as stages a fork may pass through rather than fixed properties, placing successive MariaDB versions in each in turn, and argues that a fork made in response to a stagnating original must sooner or later become independent or decline along with it.

=== Forking in distributed version control ===
Distributed revision control (DVCS) tools have popularised a less emotive use of the term "fork", blurring the distinction with "branch". With a DVCS such as Mercurial or Git, the normal way to contribute to a project, is to first create a personal branch of the repository, independent of the main repository, and later seek to have your changes integrated with it. Sites such as GitHub, Bitbucket and Launchpad provide free DVCS hosting expressly supporting independent branches, such that the technical, social and financial barriers to forking a source code repository are massively reduced, and GitHub uses "fork" as its term for this method of contribution to a project.

=== Proprietary derivatives ===
The BSD licenses permit forks to become proprietary software, and copyleft proponents say that commercial incentives thus make proprietisation almost inevitable. (Copyleft licenses can, however, be circumvented via dual-licensing with a proprietary grant in the form of a Contributor License Agreement.) Examples include macOS (based on the proprietary NeXTSTEP and the open source FreeBSD), Cedega and CrossOver (proprietary forks of Wine, though CrossOver tracks Wine and contributes considerably), EnterpriseDB (a fork of PostgreSQL, adding Oracle compatibility features), Supported PostgreSQL with their proprietary ESM storage system, and Netezza's proprietary highly scalable derivative of PostgreSQL. Some of these vendors contribute back changes to the community project, while some keep their changes as their own competitive advantages.

== Version numbering ==
Forks often restart version numbering from numbers typically used for initial versions of programs like 0.0.1, 0.1, or 1.0 even if the original software was at another version such as 3.0, 4.0, or 5.0. An exception is sometimes made when the forked software is designed to be a drop-in replacement for the original project, e.g. MariaDB for MySQL or LibreOffice for OpenOffice.org.

== Forking proprietary software ==
In proprietary software, the copyright is usually held by the employing entity, not by the individual software developers. Proprietary code is thus more commonly forked when the owner needs to develop two or more versions, such as a windowed version and a command line version, or versions for differing operating systems, such as a word processor for IBM PC compatible machines and Macintosh computers. Generally, such internal forks will concentrate on having the same look, feel, data format, and behavior between platforms so that a user familiar with one can also be productive or share documents generated on the other. This is almost always an economic decision to generate a greater market share and thus pay back the associated extra development costs created by the fork.

A notable proprietary fork not of this kind is the many varieties of proprietary Unix—almost all derived from AT&T Unix under license and all called "Unix", but increasingly mutually incompatible. See Unix wars.

== See also ==
- Custom software – Software that is specially developed for some specific organization or other user
- Downstream (software development) – Concept in computer science
- Duplicate code – Repeated fragment of computer source code
- Group decision-making – Subset of decision science
- List of software forks
- Modding – Customization of a product by the end user
- Modular programming – Organizing code into modules
- Personalization – Using technology to accommodate the differences between individuals
- ROM Hacking – Editing technique for video games
- Source port – Process of adapting software to run in a different context
- Team effectiveness – A team's ability to accomplish their goals or objectives
