= Seizure of Megaupload =

2012 filesharing website seizure

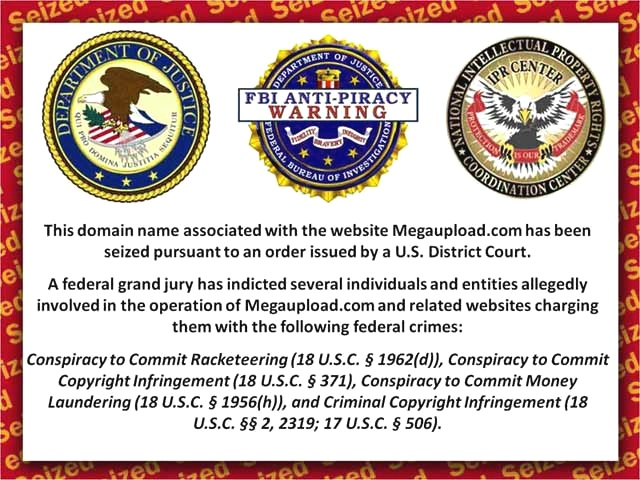
The seized domain name redirected to this joint FBI, DoJ, and NIPRCC notice of US crime charges.

The seizure of Megaupload, a popular filesharing website with 150 million registered users, occurred on January 19, 2012, following a US indictment accusing Megaupload of harbouring millions of copyrighted files. According to the indictment, Megaupload was costing copyright holders over $500 million in lost revenues.

== Background ==
A German-born programmer named Kim Dotcom founded Megaupload, which is a Hong Kong-based company established in 2005 for the use of file storage and file sharing. At its peak, Megaupload was the 13th most visited website on the Internet. Megaupload's sister sites include Megavideo.com, Megapix.com, Megalive.com, and Megabox.com.

== Seizure ==
On Thursday 19 January 2012, Megaupload and its sister sites were closed due to allegations that its founder and its other executives were in violation of laws against copyright infringement. The allegations stated that Megaupload was costing copyright holders and legitimate businesses $500 million in revenue from allegedly infringing movies, music, and other media.

Megaupload countered by stating that the allegations were "grotesquely overblown". Megaupload later proposed a partnership with content providers by stating that "the vast majority of Mega's Internet traffic is legitimate and we are here to stay. If the content industry would like to take advantage of our popularity, we are happy to enter into a dialogue. We have some good ideas. Please get in touch."

Dotcom and three other Megaupload executives were arrested in a leased $30 million luxury mansion near Auckland on Friday 20 January 2012. This was in accordance to a request from the US Federal Bureau of investigation (FBI) that Dotcom and the three other executives be extradited. The raid took place during Dotcom's birthday celebration. Assets worth $17 million were seized, and four men were arrested. These four men were Kim Dotcom, Finn Batato, Marthias Ortmann, and Bram van der Kolk. On 23 January 2012, Dotcom was refused bail due to being a flight risk, with Judge McNaughton stating that: "he was denied due to the risk [that] Mr. Dotcom would flee jurisdiction and the possibility that if he reached Germany he wouldn't be extradited to face the charges". However, on 22 February 2012, North Shore District Court Judge Nevin Dawson overturned the previous rulings and granted bail to Kim Dotcom due to the risk of Dotcom fleeing being diminished after his assets were seized.

The MPAA requested data related to Megaupload's alleged infringements be retained to use in future prosecutions and/or civil actions.

== Indictment ==
The indictment showed that key points of Megaupload's business model were evidence of criminal intent.

Key points found in the indictment:

- The vast majority of the users usually do not have access to long-term storage. The life of a file was determined by the number of downloads it received.
- Since a large portion of Megaupload's user base are not paying subscribers, Megaupload's main source of revenue is advertising. Therefore, the business model is not based upon its storage capabilities, but on maximising downloads (users see ads before attempting a download).
- Employees of Megaupload are not reliant on links to find content, as they have the ability to search the database directly.
- Megaupload employs a comprehensive take down method to identify and remove child pornography, but does not employ a similar method in regards to copyright infringement.
- Users who were uploading infringing content did not have their accounts closed, and Megaupload was not making a significant effort to identify these individuals who were uploading infringing content.
- Megaupload gave incentive for their uploaders to upload infringing content in exchange for payments. The payments were dependent on the number of downloads the uploader's file was able to achieve.

Other details found in the indictment:

- The executives of Megaupload themselves used Megaupload to download episodes of The Sopranos.
- A chat log between executives read: "we have a funny business…modern day pirates :)"
- Particular emails showed that Megaupload was willing to provide cash incentives for users to upload certain DVDs or other media.
- When Megavideo was started, Dotcom emphasised the importance of ripping videos from YouTube and hosting them on Megavideo.

== Loss of data ==
After the seizure of Megaupload, one of the primary concerns was what this meant for the future of the users' personal data. The Justice Department stated, on 20 January 2012, that Megaupload's users will most likely want to back up any data they have uploaded to Megaupload. The Justice Department also referenced Megaupload's own set of frequently asked questions, which insists that their users not solely rely upon Megaupload, as "they assume the full risk of complete loss or unavailability of their data".

Negotiations between Megaupload and the Justice Department have since been taking place, with Megaupload stating that its "legal team is working hard to reunite our users with their data". Dotcom also stated that they "found a large number of Mega accounts from US Government officials including the Department of Justice and the US Senate".

Megaupload itself is not the only one concerned about the loss of their user's personal data. The Electronic Frontier Foundation has also expressed their concerns with the loss of personal data for Megaupload's users – with their Staff Attorney stating that the "EFF is troubled that so many lawful users of Megaupload.com had their property taken from them without warning and that the government has taken no steps to help them. We think it's important that these users have their voices heard as this process moves forward." Teaming up with Carpathia Hosting, the EFF and Carpathia Hosting have started up a website (www.megaretrieval.com) to take an inventory of the innocent users affected by the seizure of Megaupload.

Leaseweb, a Dutch hosting company and Megaupload's former hosting provider, subsequently deleted all of its Megaupload user data, consisting of petabytes of data and backups from mostly European users, in 2013.

In May 2016, Cogent, the US-based company that formerly hosted Megaupload's data, warned Megaupload and the rightsholders that at least eight of the 16 hard drives containing the data had become unreadable.

== DMCA ==
The Digital Millennium Copyright Act provides safe harbor to websites who are proactively removing infringing content. However, failing to remove infringing content or having knowledge that infringing content exists revokes the website's access to the safe harbor provision.

Referring to the indictment, the Justice Department demonstrates that Megaupload was not proactively enforcing the rules of the DMCA. A user who is known under the alias of "VV" had allegedly uploaded 17,000 infringing files to Megaupload. These files have accumulated over 334 million views. None of these files were deleted; even when takedown requests were made.

== Reactions ==
Hacktivist group Anonymous retaliated with massive distributed denial-of-service attacks against the websites of the RIAA, MPAA, BMI, FBI, and many others.

Various web companies have expressed their concerns with the future of file storage websites – specifically the powers that are available to the US government to seize websites. Megaupload's competitors such as Filesonic, Fileserve, Filejungle, and 4shared have all limited their services.

- Filesonic, one of Megaupload's top competitors, has completely shut down the file sharing capabilities of its website. Users of Filesonic are now only able to download files that they themselves have uploaded.
- Fileserve, another of Megaupload's top competitors, shut down its affiliate program. Also, as with Filesonic, Fileserve now disallows downloads from third parties.
- Uploaded.to has banned US IP addresses – disallowing US residents to access their site.
- Video streaming sites VideoBB and VideoZer have both closed their affiliate programs and rapidly deleted accounts and hosted files.
- Uploading.com stopped revenue share with users.
