= MediaFire =

File hosting service

- Website type: Online Backup Service
- Available in: English
- Area served: Worldwide
- Owners: MediaFire, LLC
- Founders: Derek Labian; Tom Langridge
- Website: www.mediafire.com
- Commercial: Yes
- Registration: Not required for downloading or uploading. (1GB file limit for uploading without an account)
- Launched: October 20, 2006; 19 years ago
- Current status: Active
- Content license: Proprietary Software (Windows, Mac and Linux clients)

MediaFire is a file hosting, file synchronization, and cloud storage service based in Shenandoah, Texas, United States. Founded in June 2006 by Derek Labian and Tom Langridge, the company provides client software for Microsoft Windows, macOS, Linux, Android, iOS, BlackBerry 10, and web browsers.

== Storage ==
As of July 2012, features of MediaFire include up to 50 GB of storage (starting at 10 GB then increased by as much as 40 GB when various activities like installing mobile or desktop clients, or when sharing on Facebook and Twitter are done).

In April 2014, MediaFire responded to reduced pricing from Google Drive by increasing its professional storage plan from 100GB to 1TB and reducing its monthly price to US$2.50 per month.

Business account storage is shared across all sub-accounts allowing for single billing and management of multiple users at a single company. MediaFire's free account service does not require download activity in order to preserve files, and is thus often suitable as a backup only solution. MediaFire does not officially support free data warehousing (long-term storage for free and inactive accounts).

== Client ==
=== Mobile ===
MediaFire originally released Android (January 2013) and iOS (July 2012) clients based on the Appcelerator framework and updated them with native versions in 2014. The mobile apps provide importing of photos and video taken on the device, and remote access to the contents of your MediaFire account.

=== Desktop ===
The MediaFire desktop clients, originally launched in November 2013, are available for macOS and Microsoft Windows providing file and folder synchronization with any MediaFire account. Additional features include file and folder sharing, notifications, screen capture, and selective syncing. MediaFire's desktop client software is available for the following devices: PCs running Windows XP, Windows Vista, Windows 7, and Windows 8, or Mac OS X 10.7 or higher and require at least 1 GB of RAM and 600 MB of disk space. As MediaFire announced at 19 May MediaFire Desktop Sync will stop working at 30 July 2016. After this date only the web version can be used on desktop computers.

== File sharing ==
Both public and private file sharing are supported through MediaFire. Private file sharing consists of a user sharing directly to another user or a group of users and is done through importing contacts or email. The account holder is able to control read or write permissions on a per user basis. Public sharing consists of a user getting a public link, which allows anyone with the link to download the file. Public links are always read only. MediaFire also supports sharing with one-time links, which are only valid for a single use.

In 2013, MediaFire added support for both audio and video streaming through its online file viewer.

MediaFire supports a variety of file formats through its web based file viewer:

- Image files (.JPEG, .PNG, .GIF, .TIFF, .BMP)
- Video files (WebM, .MPEG4, .MOV, .AVI, .MPEGPS, .WMV, .FLV, .3GP, .OGG, .VOB, .MP4)
- Text files (.TXT)
- Markup/Code (.CSS, .HTML, .PHP, .C, .CPP, .H, .HPP, .JS, .java, .pl)
- Microsoft Word (.DOC and .DOCX)
- Microsoft Excel (.XLS and .XLSX)
- Microsoft PowerPoint (.PPT and .PPTX)
- Adobe Portable Document Format (.PDF)

== Platform ==
MediaFire announced public access to its platform, API, and Developer Center, in July 2014. Along with documentation on the API, they also opened a public forum and released SDKs for Java, JavaScript, and Objective-C. A C++ SDK has been announced but has not yet been released.

== Reception ==
PC Magazine named MediaFire both one of the "Top 100 Undiscovered websites" in 2007 and a "Top Website of 2008". It has also been reviewed favorably by CNET and Lifehacker. Lifehacker praised the site not only for the usefulness of the service but also for its use of an unlimited upload size for users in 2006.

In 2014, MediaFire was ranked 10th in "The Fastest Growing Cloud Apps of 2014" by SkyHigh Networks.

== See also ==
- Mega
- RapidShare
- Google Drive
- OneDrive
- Dropbox
