= Ira P. Rothken =

American lawyer

- Education: Brandeis University; Golden Gate University School of Law
- Occupation: Attorney
- Employer: Rothken Law Firm

Ira P. Rothken is an American high technology attorney and computer scientist who has handled numerous cases of first impression involving the internet and new technologies.

== Early life ==
Rothken is a graduate of Brandeis University with a bachelor's degree in science and Golden Gate University School of Law where he was Editor in Chief of the Intellectual Property Law Review.

== Career ==
Rothken, a former medical researcher and computer scientist, began the Northern California-based Rothken Law Firm in 1993 and the firm has evolved from the beginning of the commercial internet in 1995 to emphasize complex high technology related litigation.

According to a July 31, 2007 CNET News.com article profiling Ira P. Rothken's legal career:

- "Tech start-ups sued by media conglomerates for copyright infringement typically call on Rothken, a medical researcher turned lawyer. He's made a name for himself by bucking entertainment empires and by backing long-shot copyright cases, such as those involving RecordTV, ReplayTV and MP3Board.com. His efforts have won him praise from the Electronic Frontier Foundation (EFF), the advocacy group that has become synonymous with user rights on the Web."

Rothken has been described as a litigator who is both creative and tough.

=== Internet gambling cases ===
One of Rothken's earliest cases alleged that credit card companies were involved in providing illegal gambling loans to users of internet gambling sites. In this case, Rothken pointed out "We want the court to say Visa and MasterCard can't make money on illegal transactions...." The case resulted in credit card companies settling and providing, amongst other things, a notice to their card holders that their card may not be used to fund online gambling. As a result of the case, Ed Dixon, a spokesman for MasterCard admitted that they introduced new rules related to Internet gambling. Later, Visa affiliates agreed to clear the credit rating of Rothken's client and issue warnings to consumers.

=== Internet search engine cases ===
Several of Rothken's cases have involved defending various search engines. Rothken's reason is simple: "We all recognize that the greater good is to allow for robust search...Search is just too important to society. Regardless of the percentage of [illegal] files, even if it's a large percentage of those files that ultimately will lead to downstream content that's unauthorized, search of that content should still be allowed... When you look at the total picture... do we believe that search engines for .torrent files should be banned altogether? Most people would say no."

=== Cases of first impression ===
Many of Rothken's high technology legal actions have included issues of first impression where original issues of law are presented for decision by the court. In these cases, there is no precedent for the legal issue at hand in a specific court. Often Rothken's cases of first impression involve complex technology issues.

Examples of first impression cases include:

- Rothken is the lead global defense counsel for Kim Dotcom and his company Megaupload in what has been called the largest criminal copyright case in US history.
- Rothken represented consumers as lead counsel in a suit brought on behalf of consumers against Microsoft, Symantec, Adobe, and others; related to their software "EULA" and shrinkwrap policies, in Baker v. Microsoft et al. These shrink-wrap licenses could not be read by consumers prior to unwrapping the software, at which point major retailers would refuse to allow return of the software. This case resulted in a settlement that led to policy changes, created a more transparent market for software companies to compete on licensing terms, and benefitted consumers nationwide.
- Rothken was co-lead class counsel representing owners of Treo 600 and Treo 650 smartphones made by Palm; in a nationwide federal court class action lawsuit consolidated in the Northern District of California titled in re Palm Treo, claiming the devices are inherently defective, resulting in a multimillion-dollar nationwide class recovery.
- Rothken was co-lead class counsel representing owners of T-Mobile Sidekick smartphones; in a nationwide federal court class action lawsuit consolidated in the Northern District of California titled in re Sidekick, claiming a massive corruption of data integrity and interruption of consumer data access, resulting in a multimillion-dollar nationwide class recovery.
- Rothken was co-lead class counsel and liaison counsel to the Court representing owners of Apple iPhone 4 smartphones, in a suit dubbed as "Antenna-gate" because of comments made by Steve Jobs. Rothken claimed defective antenna design leading to degraded connectivity and dropped calls, resulting in a class remedy of 15 dollars per iPhone 4 claimant.
- Rothken was co-lead settlement class counsel in a nationwide consumer privacy lawsuit brought against DoubleClick, for allegedly intruding on web user privacy; consolidated in the Southern District of New York and titled in re DoubleClick Privacy Litigation, resulting in a nationwide class settlement.
- Rothken represented consumers as lead counsel in a suit against a Music CD Recording Company and its Digital Rights Management scheme; in connection to violations of their privacy and first sale doctrine rights, in DeLise v. Sunncomm et al.
- Rothken was involved in the first case where a court ordered that defendants had to turn over contents of random access memory. "Lawyers will be flinging around preservation letters, coming up with all kinds of creative ways to tell the other to preserve RAM", Rothken opined. "That would cause huge economic implications. If it's not changed, it can create e-discovery chaos".
- Rothken was the lead defense counsel in a case of first impression brought by the major motion picture studios against an online interactive services provider; which argued that its Internet centric VCR, created out of software code, is just as lawful as a physical VCR and it should not have to pay any Copyright damages, in MGM et al. v. RecordTV.com, Inc.
- Rothken was lead plaintiff's counsel in a lawsuit to enjoin the RIAA's Clean Slate "Amnesty" program as it allegedly did not provide a full release of copyright claims against consumers who were required, as a condition of entering the program, to make admissions of copyright infringement; which led to a negotiated settlement that benefitted consumers nationwide.
- Rothken was also lead defense counsel defending a large search engine in Federal Court against claims by the RIAA for secondary copyright infringement arising out of hyperlinks to mp3 music files; in Arista Records et al. v. MP3Board.com.
- Rothken defended bit torrent site isoHunt in a copyright case of first impression, regarding the reach of secondary civil copyright infringement and the DMCA safe harbors. "One person's 'worst search engine' is another person's 'robust search engine'", said isoHunt's attorney, Rothken. "Should we as a society not allow torrent search engines because some groups like the major studios don't like the state of the Internet as it relates to .torrent files?" he asked.
- Rothken served as lead counsel along with the Electronic Frontier Foundation, defending the rights of consumers including Craig Newmark (founder of Craigslist), under the Copyright fair use doctrine; to use their net-connected ReplayTV devices (digital video recorders) to space-shift and commercial-skip television programs, in Newmark v. Turner Broadcasting et al.
- Rothken was a co-lead defense counsel in the trial court and Seventh Circuit Court of Appeals in Stayart v. Yahoo et al.; which found that the plaintiff did not have a protectable commercial interest in her name under certain sections of the Lanham Act; and thus affirmed the trial court's dismissal of such claims against a major search engine and social networking site.

=== Megaupload ===
One of Rothken's best known cases involves the defense of former cloud storage provider Megaupload and its founder Kim Dotcom.

Rothken is the lead global defense counsel for Kim Dotcom and Megaupload in what has been called the largest criminal copyright case in US history.

Rothken had represented Megaupload and Kim Dotcom in other matters, such as the case alleging Universal Music did an improper takedown notice of a well known Megaupload video from YouTube in which several pop stars gave a performance praising Megaupload.

On January 20, 2012, Megaupload and Kim Dotcom were raided by a force involving dozens of members of the New Zealand elite Special Tactics Group and Armed Offenders Squad under the direction of the FBI.

In articles and interviews, Rothken pointed out how this raid has caused millions of innocent users to lose access to their personal files, such as Microsoft Word and Excel files, stored on the Megaupload servers, as this raid destroyed the company in an instant. At the SF MusicTech Summit, Julie Samuels, staff attorney for Electronic Frontier Foundation, and Rothken discussed how the government, after seizing the data, then quickly sent a letter to Carpathia, an ISP that provides server space, strongly encouraging them to delete the data of Megaupload and all the data of their customers that was stored on Megaupload. Samuels and Rothken discussed many aspects of the effects of the government actions on innocent parties such as the server company, and customers who relied on Megaupload, as backup storage, who were suddenly denied all access to their personal files. They discuss how the governments actions in this case were incredibly more aggressive than in other cases involving seizures, such as of online gambling sites where the casinos were still allowed to operate. Because of the unnoticed shutdown that resulted from the Megaupload seizure, "lots of protected speech is now offline," said Rothken, adding that the process in this case, where the material was taken offline without any chance to avoid harm to innocent parties, shows exactly why the adversarial process must always be used to give courts a chance to narrowly tailor rulings as to what the government should be allowed to take offline while protecting the interests of innocent users. Samuels pointed out that few defendants have the resources to fight a case of this type against the government, and Rothken mentioned, because of government freezing assets, how most of the 20 lawyers working on this case have received very little, if any, payment for their work. Samuels asserts that in many similar cases the government has finally admitted, as much as 12 to 18 months after taking sites offline, they did not have sufficient evidence to support the shutdowns.

When the operation was over, the U.S. Department of Justice issued a press release: "This action is among the largest criminal copyright cases ever brought by the United States and directly targets the misuse of a public content storage and distribution site to commit and facilitate intellectual property crime."

Rothken undertook the representation of Megaupload and Kim Dotcom on the day of the raid and assembled and coordinated the global legal team. Rothken made a number of appearances in the United States Court in the Eastern District of Virginia in an effort, along with EFF, to negotiate the preservation and return of user files, and while the Court initially entertained such arguments and ordered briefing, the Judge has yet to rule.

In addition Rothken and his co-counsel, William Burck from Quinn Emmanuel, filed motions to dismiss Megaupload from the case due to failure of the United States to serve the foreign corporate entity. Rothken and his team cited the rule that required the US to serve a foreign corporation at an office in the United States. Megaupload Ltd., a Hong Kong Corporation, did not have a corporate office in the United States and therefore could never be served. The Judge has yet to make a final ruling on the motion to dismiss, leaving Megaupload in a state of limbo where all of its assets were frozen by the US and it is both not dismissed and not served.

Rothken had a succinct description of the US government case against Megaupload and Kim Dotcom: "wrong on the facts and wrong on the law." In Rothken's words, the government is acting over-aggressively and overbroadly by taking down one of the world's largest cloud storage services "without any notice or chance for Megaupload to be heard in a court of law." The result ignores substantial non infringing uses of cloud storage and is both "offensive to the rights of Megaupload and to the rights of millions of consumers worldwide" who stored personal data with the service.

In Rothken's view, attempting to hold a cloud storage provider criminally responsible for the acts of its users is known as "secondary" criminal copyright liability and there is no such statutory claim under US Law. Secondary copyright liability is judge made law in "civil" cases, such as Grokster, and such theories are not "criminal" in nature. Instead, the government's willingness to pursue the case as an international racketeering charge meant "essentially only sticking up for one side of the copyright vs. technology debate." The result, Rothken says, is "terrible chilling effect it's having on Internet innovators" who feature cloud storage components to their business.

Rothken was unhappy about the police raid on Kim Dotcom's family:

- "Using "James Bond tactics with helicopters and weaponry, and breaking into homes over what is apparently a philosophical debate over the balance between copyright protection and the freedom to innovate, are heavy-handed tactics, are over-aggressive, and have a detrimental effect on society as a whole," Rothken said. In addition, the raid was a reminder that bills like the Stop Online Piracy Act "ought not to ever be passed, because these tactics [the helicopters, etc.] are so offensive that if you take the shackles off of government, it may lead to more abuse, more aggression."

Rothken also suggested that the timing of the raid was suspicious; "over a two-year period, they happened to pick the one week where SOPA started going south."

Rothken and his global legal team were able to show that the U.S. government recruited the New Zealand authorities to engage in various illegal activities in New Zealand. Although some of the facts are still being uncovered, it is undisputed that the New Zealand authorities illegally spied on Kim Dotcom prior to his arrest, and continued to spy on him illegally for an additional time after the arrest.

Issues were raised with how broadly the original search warrant was written. According to Rothken the warrant was very broad, and could have included family photos. It provided little guidance on what to actually gather, leading the court to determine the search warrant was overly broad. The U.S. then quickly removed the seized information from New Zealand, even before the court could make this ruling. "They just went and grabbed everything. It's like, literally going into someone's home with a search warrant and just clearing the whole place out, which happened." said Auckland defense lawyer Gary Gotlieb. The Court found that the raid on Dotcom's home in Coatesville was illegal based on invalid search warrants and that the police illegally seized Kim Dotcom's computer systems and data. The Court also found that the United States violated the law when they removed Dotcom's data from New Zealand without authorization.

While the ultimate repercussions of those illegal activities are still unclear, Rothken has written that they lend no credibility to the U.S. prosecution's case against Megaupload and Kim Dotcom.

In an interview with Larry Williams, Rothken made the point "how the government conducts themselves in trying to prosecute someone matters." Because of all the problems already found by the courts, Rothken called for a global dismissal of the case. Rothken laid out a "constellation of facts" that supports his conclusion that this case is related to SOPA failing in the U.S. Congress, and "this appears to be some sort of a political solution to gain the support of Hollywood". When asked why his client doesn't simply come to the U.S. and answer the charges, Rothken additionally claimed these are the very factors that would deny his client a fair trial in the United States.

Rothken, declined to say whether his legal team has uncovered the full details of the illegal spying. He did tell the Huffington Post in a March 2013 interview his views about the nature of illegal US spying on the internet and that they are trying to learn more:

- "Based upon the public record and cases in the United States, and an understanding about how Echelon works, which is this global spying arrangement between United States, Canada, New Zealand, Australia and Great Britain, we came to the preliminary view that in essence New Zealand was working with the United States to basically grab everything," he said. "Not just against Kim Dotcom, but basically grabbing all email in relative real time and storing it so that one day if they need to they could datamine it."
- "As part of our request to the [NZ] court," Rothken said, "we asked for discovery that was tailored not only to protecting Kim Dotcom's rights but the rights of all residents of New Zealand, and we've asked for the full scope of all the data they've obtained."

=== E-Discovery work ===
Rothken has been involved in handling issues in electronic discovery in a legal think tank. Rothken co-edited a leading Commentary on the issues of preserving, managing, and identifying not reasonably accessible electronically stored information or "NRA ESI". The result is a five-step framework for analysis and six Guidelines for making reasonable, good-faith assessments where no "bright line" rules exist.

Rothken's activities with the Sedona Conference included speaking at Conferences and Seminars on e-discovery issues. Rothken worked with Judges and technology lawyers to evolve how e-discovery issues are handled in Courts nationwide.

=== E-Commerce and Interactive Entertainment ===
Rothken has been involved in advising on e-commerce legal strategies since the inception of the commercial internet in the mid-1990s. Rothken has represented some of the most successful web sites in the world on a huge range of matters from startup issues to risk reduction strategies to development of early affiliate programs to e-commerce policies and agreements. In many instances he was called upon to handle issues where there was no clear precedent and thus had to innovate a solution. Examples of technology companies Rothken has helped in the startup phase include FriendFinder (Social Networking), Pandemic Studios (which he negotiated the spin off from Activision and started the company), ArenaNet (The makers of Guild Wars in which he helped obtain the seed funding and started the company along with persons formally with Blizzard), Nihilistic (in which he negotiated multiple game development deals and started the company with former LucasArts employees), and Telltale (in which he started the company with former LucasArts employees, negotiated numerous development deals, and helped obtain seed funding).

Rothken assisted developers and content creators in negotiating agreements with some of the most valuable intellectual property franchises in the world including for example, Star Wars, The Simpsons, and CSI.

Rothken assisted in the negotiations of the sale of the FriendFinder family of websites to a Penthouse controlled entity for a half billion dollars in 2007.

Rothken was involved in the global roll out of cloud storage provider Mega and was introduced on stage by Kim Dotcom in the January 20th 2013 New Zealand press conference where he answered questions regarding the service.

Rothken has appeared as a guest legal expert on television and radio including CNN (internet privacy), KQED radio (computer keyboard injuries), FOX (internet gambling), NBC (internet copyright), CBS (internet privacy), CNET radio (internet copyright), KTVU Silicon Valley Business Report (software license agreements), Bloomberg (copyright Litigation), and Court TV (internet gambling issues and copyright litigation).
