= Baboom =

Music service based in Portugal

- Available in: English
- Headquarters: {{{location_country}}}
- Country of origin: Portugal
- Founder: Kim Dotcom
- Launched: August 17, 2015; 11 years ago
- Current status: Shutdown
- Native clients on: Android, iOS

Baboom was a music service based in Portugal. It was founded by Kim Dotcom, although Baboom and Dotcom severed ties almost a year before the service's launch. Baboom was launched on 17 August 2015. Baboom described the service as a "Music marketplace that combines Fair Trade Streaming with a music store". The service however was quickly put on hold "until further notice", as stated on Baboom's website, even before it could celebrate its first year.

== Model ==
Baboom's website stated that users can play the music they want on any device, own the music forever, support artists, be part of the "inner circle", and upload their own music.

It also stated the service gives artists 90% of the revenue, fair trade streaming, premium following, a rights management system and a career analytics system.

Russel Brown of the Public Address blog said in a review that:

the most interesting thing about Baboom is the way it addresses some of the problems with the streaming market we've discussed here in recent weeks. Its "fair trade streaming" model works in a fundamentally different way to Spotify et al.

== Apps ==
The service supported both iOS and Android. The apps had limited functionality, with the only features being playing and downloading music.
