= Good Times (Kim Dotcom album) =

Studio album by Kim Dotcom
- Released: 20 January 2014
- Recorded: Roundhead Studios, Auckland
- Genre: Electronic dance music
- Length: 60:45
- Label: Kimpire Music
- Producer: Kim Dotcom

Good Times is the debut studio album recorded by Finnish–German entrepreneur Kim Dotcom. It reached No. 8 in the Recorded Music NZ Top 40 album chart.

== Background and recording ==
Good Times was recorded at Roundhead Studios in Auckland, New Zealand, and was begun in 2011.

== Composition ==
Good Times is an electronic dance music (EDM) album, exploring a variety of subgenres, including trance and drum and bass, and features hip hop influences and synth sounds. It contains completely positive themes.

== Release and promotion ==
Good Times was released worldwide by his independent record label Kimpire Music on 20 January 2014. Dotcom performed at Rhythm & Vines on 31 December 2013; the set was filmed, and music videos for "Amazing", "Party Amplifier" and "Change Your Life" have been released. Dotcom said that he played the album to American hip hop producer Swizz Beatz, who enjoyed it.

== Reception ==
Chris Schulz of The New Zealand Herald called the album "a musical mess" and rated it one star out of five. Gizmodo's Jack Tomlin criticised the album for being overproduced; he wrote that if it is meant by Dotcom to be a satirical take on contemporary EDM, then it is excellent. David Farrier from 3 News described the album as "not as bad as you'd expect". Vicki Anderson of The Press compared Dotcom's vocals on the album to those of German electronic music band Kraftwerk.

Good Times entered the New Zealand Albums Chart dated 27 January 2014 at number twenty. The following week it moved up to number seventeen. The week after that, it reached number eight, its peak position.

== Track listing ==
Good Times
No.	Title	Writer(s)	Producer(s)	Length
1.	"Amazing" (featuring Laughton Kora)	Printz Board; Deryk Mitchell; Laughton Kora; Kim Dotcom	Kim Dotcom; Printz Board; Deryk Mitchell	3:39
2.	"Good Times" (featuring Ilati)	Jazelle Paris; Deryk Mitchell; Gerrell King; Kim Dotcom	Kim Dotcom; Deryk Mitchell	3:19
3.	"Dance Dance Dance"	Kim Dotcom; Printz Board; Deryk Mitchell	Kim Dotcom; Printz Board; Deryk Mitchell	3:45
4.	"Keeps Getting Better" (featuring Ilati)	Jazelle Paris; Deryk Mitchell; Kim Dotcom	Kim Dotcom; Deryk Mitchell; Rellevant; J.D. Walker	3:30
5.	"Change Your Life" (featuring Laughton Kora)	Deryk Mitchell; Jazelle Paris	Kim Dotcom; Deryk Mitchell	3:15
6.	"Universe" (featuring Amari)	Jazelle Paris; Gerrell King	Kim Dotcom; Rellevant	3:35
7.	"Little Bit of Me" (featuring Tiki Taane)	Jazelle Paris; Deryk Mitchell; Tiki Taane; Kim Dotcom	Kim Dotcom; Deryk Mitchell; Rellevant; J.D. Walker	3:27
8.	"Party Electricity" (featuring Amari)	Jazelle Paris; Gerrell King; Kim Dotcom	Kim Dotcom; J.D. Walker	3:33
9.	"Wunderbar" (Interlude)	Kim Dotcom	Kim Dotcom; J.D. Walker; Deryk Mitchell; Rellevant	1:25
10.	"To Be With You" (featuring Ilati)	Deryk Mitchell; Jazelle Paris; Kim Dotcom; Joshua Walker	Kim Dotcom; J.D. Walker; Deryk Mitchell	4:32
11.	"Good Life" (featuring Printz Board)	Printz Board; Deryk Mitchell; Kim Dotcom	Kim Dotcom; Printz Board; Deryk Mitchell	4:32
12.	"Party Amplifier" (featuring Printz Board)	Printz Board; Deryk Mitchell; Kim Dotcom	Kim Dotcom; Printz Board; Deryk Mitchell	3:49
13.	"Take Me Away" (featuring Mona Dotcom)	Printz Board; Deryk Mitchell; Kim Dotcom	Kim Dotcom; Printz Board; Deryk Mitchell	3:34
14.	"Beathoven" (Interlude)			2:13
15.	"Fireworks" (featuring Ilati)	Jazelle Paris; Gerrell King; Joshua Walker	Kim Dotcom; J.D. Walker; Rellevant	6:36
16.	"Live My Life"	Printz Board; Kim Dotcom	Kim Dotcom; Printz Board	3:27
17.	"Beathoven Slow"			3:11
Total length:				01:00:45
