= Kim Dotcom =

German-Finnish Internet entrepreneur (born 1974)

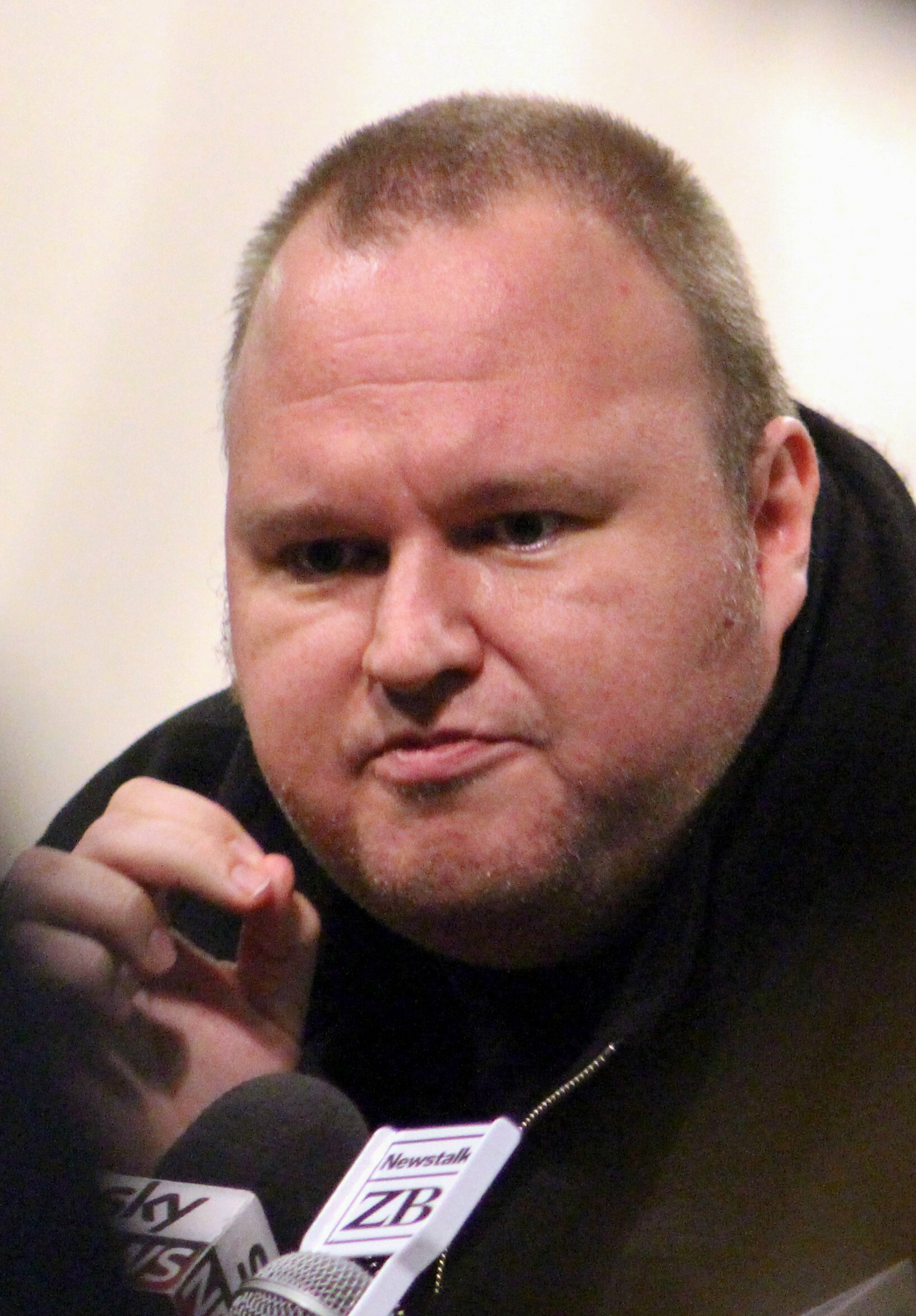
- Dotcom in 2013
- Born: Kim Schmitz; 21 January 1974 (age 52); Kiel, Schleswig-Holstein, West Germany
- Other names: Kimble, Kim Tim Jim Vestor
- Citizenship: Germany; Finland
- Education: Middle school
- Occupation: Entrepreneur
- Years active: 2005–present
- Known for: Founder and CEO of Megaupload, Mega and K.im
- Height: 2 m (6 ft 7 in)
- Political party: Internet Party (2014–2018)
- Criminal charges: Computer fraud, data espionage, embezzlement
- Criminal penalty: Two-year suspended sentence, Five months served and twenty months' suspended sentence
- Spouses: Mona Verga (m. 2009; div. 2014) Elizabeth Donnelly (m. 2018)
- Children: 6
- Website: kim.com

Kim Dotcom (né Schmitz; born 21 January 1974), also known as Kimble and Kim Tim Jim Vestor, is a German-Finnish Internet entrepreneur and political activist who lives in Auckland, New Zealand.

Dotcom rose to fame in Germany in the 1990s as a hacker and an Internet entrepreneur. He was arrested in 1994 for trafficking in stolen phone calling card numbers. He was convicted on eleven charges of computer fraud, ten charges of data espionage, and various other charges in 1998 for which he served a two-year suspended sentence. In 2003, he was deported from Thailand to Germany, where he pleaded guilty to embezzlement in November 2003 and after five months in jail awaiting trial he received another 20 months suspended sentence.

Dotcom is the founder and former CEO of the defunct file-hosting service Megaupload (2005–2012). In 2012, the United States Department of Justice seized its website and pressed charges against Dotcom, including criminal copyright infringement, money laundering, racketeering and wire fraud. Dotcom was residing in New Zealand at the time; at the request of US authorities, New Zealand police raided his home in 2012 and arrested him. Dotcom was granted bail and initiated legal proceedings to challenge his arrest and the police's search and seizure of evidence, a process that has stretched over a decade without resolution as of 2026.

In 2017, a New Zealand court ruled that Dotcom could be extradited to the US on fraud charges related to Megaupload. Dotcom denied any wrongdoing and has accused US authorities of pursuing a vendetta against him on behalf of politically influential Hollywood studios. In 2018, the New Zealand Court of Appeal upheld the lower court's ruling. Dotcom appealed to the Supreme Court of New Zealand, which ruled in 2020 that Dotcom could be extradited to the United States, but that he could challenge the decision through judicial review. His extradition order was eventually signed on 15 August 2024. Dotcom has remained free in New Zealand while continuing to pursue judicial review of his extradition order.

In 2013, Dotcom launched another cloud storage service called Mega, although he severed all ties with the service in 2015. He also started and funded the Internet Party. The party contested the 2014 New Zealand general election under an electoral alliance with the Mana Movement and contested the 2017 general election independently, but failed to win any seats at either election.

== Early life ==
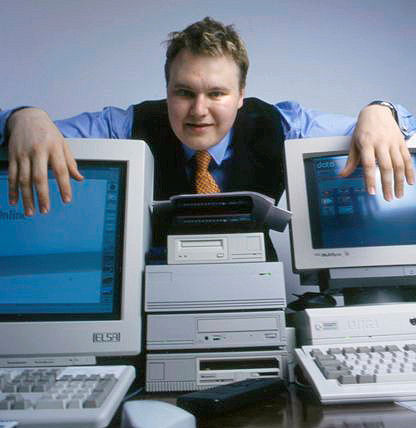
Kim Schmitz in 1996

Dotcom was born as Kim Schmitz in 1974 in Kiel in the northern part of West Germany. His mother was Finnish, from Turku, so he holds a Finnish passport and has siblings in Finland. His father was German. He legally changed his surname to Dotcom in 2005.

Prior to his arrest in New Zealand, he enjoyed a luxurious life. In 2001, his main source of income was a company called Kimvestor, and he was known for spending his money on expensive cars and boats. During the 2000 Monaco Formula One Grand Prix, Dotcom chartered a 240-foot (73 m) yacht and used it to host parties for guests such as Prince Rainier of Monaco.

He was granted permanent residence in New Zealand on 29 November 2010. While his residency was under consideration, Dotcom was planning a fireworks show in Auckland at a cost of NZ$600,000. He leased a mansion in Coatesville, a rural community near Auckland, owned by entrepreneurs Richard and Ruth Bradley, and considered one of the most expensive homes in the country. He wanted to buy the mansion when the lease expired.

Before his arrest in New Zealand, he was the world's number-one-ranked Call of Duty: Modern Warfare 3 player for having the highest cumulative score in free for all mode out of more than 15 million online players.

== Personal life ==
In 2007, Dotcom met Mona Verga and married her on 10 July 2009. Dotcom had one child from a previous relationship, who was born in September 2007. Dotcom and Verga had four children together, all using IVF treatment. The couple's first child together was born in 2009. Their second child together was born in 2010. Verga gave birth to twin girls in Auckland in March 2012, a month after Dotcom was released on bail from Mt Eden prison. On 17 May 2014, Dotcom announced on Twitter that he and Verga were separated and filing for divorce. Four days earlier, Verga left her directorship positions in the Dotcom family's companies.

In March 2014, Dotcom was criticised by The Times of Israel and the New Zealand Jewish Council for his purchase of a rare signed copy of Adolf Hitler's Mein Kampf, with Council president Stephen Goodman saying it was "morally unacceptable". Dotcom said the book was a financial investment and that he was the victim of a "disgusting smear campaign".

In November 2017, Dotcom announced he would marry his fiancée, Elizabeth Donnelly, on 20 January 2018; the anniversary of the raid during which he was arrested. They had been dating for two years and in 2017 moved to Queenstown to live. Their first child together was born in November 2022. This was Dotcom's sixth child, also conceived using IVF.

In November 2024, Dotcom announced that he suffered a "serious stroke". In 2025, he moved to Dunedin where he is receiving medical treatment.

== Legal investigations ==
=== Germany ===
As a teenager, Schmitz acquired a reputation in Germany after saying that he had bypassed the security of NASA, the Pentagon and Citibank under the name of Kimble, derived from Richard Kimble, a character in the 1963 TV series The Fugitive. Some of these hacks are disputed. He also stated that he had hacked corporate PBX systems in the United States and said he was selling the access codes.

Schmitz operated a bulletin board system called "House of Coolness" where users would trade pirated software; around 1993, Schmitz was reportedly targeted by German anti-piracy lawyer Günter von Gravenreuth, and had become a paid informant. Schmitz was arrested in March 1994 for selling stolen phone numbers and held in custody for a month. He was arrested again in 1998 on more hacking charges and convicted of 11 counts of computer fraud and 10 counts of data espionage. He was given a two-year suspended sentence; the judge of the case described Schmitz's actions as "youthful foolishness".

In 2001, Schmitz bought €375,000 worth of shares of the nearly bankrupt company Letsbuyit.com [de] and subsequently announced his intention to invest €50 million in the company. The announcement caused the share value of Letsbuyit.com to jump, resulting in a €1.5 million profit for Schmitz.

=== Thailand ===
Dotcom moved to Thailand to avoid investigation, but was arrested there at the request of the German embassy. In response, he allegedly pretended to kill himself online and declared through his website that he wished to be known as "His Royal Highness King Kimble the First, Ruler of the Kimpire". He was deported back to Germany where he pleaded guilty to embezzlement in November 2003 and, after five months in jail awaiting trial, again received a suspended sentence, this time of 20 months. After avoiding a prison sentence for a second time, he left Germany and moved to Hong Kong in late 2003.

=== Hong Kong ===
Dotcom registered Kimpire Limited in December 2003, soon after moving there. He set up a network of interlinked companies, including Trendax, which he said was an artificial intelligence-driven hedge fund. However, Trendax was never registered with Hong Kong's Securities and Futures Commission and the company was not legally allowed to accept investments or to conduct trades. After moving to New Zealand, Dotcom did not disclose his investment activity to the Securities and Futures Commission and was fined HK$8,000.

== Move to New Zealand ==
Dotcom visited New Zealand for 10 days in December 2008 and again for two months in 2009. He applied for residency and received it in November 2010. Immigration New Zealand made its decision on his application, despite his foreign convictions and despite his persona non grata status in Thailand, after officials used a special direction to waive "good character" requirements. Warwick Tuck, head of Immigration New Zealand, said that Dotcom had been granted residency as an "investor plus", or someone who invested $10 million in New Zealand.

Despite granting him residency, Immigration New Zealand expressed concern that their decision might attract criticism that they had allowed Dotcom to buy his way into the country and attempted to keep it secret. Dotcom's residency status subsequently became the subject of intense media speculation when it came to light that Auckland mayor John Banks had become involved and that New Zealand's intelligence services had spied on him—an act made illegal by Dotcom's possession of residency in New Zealand. Immigration New Zealand officers judged Dotcom's convictions in Hong Kong to be too minor to consider deporting him.

On his residency application of 3 June 2010, Dotcom erroneously denied having been convicted of dangerous driving; he had pled guilty to dangerous driving north of Auckland in September 2009. The media speculated at the time that this could provide grounds for deportation.

=== Involvement with Auckland mayor John Banks ===
John Banks met Dotcom when Banks was Mayor of Auckland City. He asked Dotcom for help putting on a fireworks display in the city's harbour. Banks later attended a New Year's Eve party thrown by Dotcom at the city centre apartment of now bankrupt property developer David Henderson. He said it provided a great view of the fireworks display detonated over the Waitematā Harbour. Banks said he had advised Dotcom on how to obtain permission from the Overseas Investment Office to buy the Coatesville mansion.

On 28 April 2012, Dotcom said he had donated $50,000 to John Banks' mayoral campaign in 2010 and that Banks had asked him to split the donation in two, allowing the Banks campaign to claim them as anonymous by falling within the anonymous limit of $25,000. In 2014, Banks was found guilty of filing a false electoral return, with evidence from Dotcom playing a major part in the case. This conviction was subsequently overturned on appeal following the discovery of new evidence, and a planned retrial was later cancelled and a verdict of acquittal entered.

Among Dotcom's revelations was a phone call from Banks, thanking him for the contribution. Dotcom subsequently recorded a song titled Amnesia, which mocks John Banks and the controversy of Dotcom's donation to him. A poll in October 2012 found the New Zealand public had a more favourable view of Kim Dotcom than of Banks.

== Megaupload arrest and extradition proceedings ==
Megaupload.com's logo

In February 2003, Dotcom set up Data Protect Limited, but changed the name to Megaupload in 2005. He was the chief executive officer. Megaupload was an online file-hosting and sharing service in which users could share links to files for viewing or editing, much of it pirated. Eventually it had over 150 employees, US$175 million revenues, and 50 million daily visitors. At its peak Megaupload was estimated to be the 13th-most popular site on the Internet and responsible for 4% of all Internet traffic.

On 5 January 2012, indictments were filed in Virginia in the United States against Dotcom and other company executives with crimes including racketeering, conspiring to commit copyright infringement, and conspiring to commit money laundering. Two weeks later on 20 January, Dotcom, Finn Batato, Mathias Ortmann and Bram van der Kolk were arrested in Coatesville, New Zealand by the New Zealand Police, in an armed raid on Dotcom's house involving 76 officers and two helicopters. Seized assets included eighteen luxury cars, large TVs, works of art and US$175 million in cash. Dotcom's bank accounts were frozen, denying him access to 64 bank accounts world-wide, including BNZ and Kiwibank accounts in New Zealand, government bonds and money from numerous PayPal accounts.

Dotcom was remanded to Mt Eden Prison and alleged poor treatment by the authorities. On 22 February, North Shore District Court Judge Nevin Dawson overturned previous rulings and released Dotcom on bail, reasoning that Dotcom had neither the ability nor desire to flee the country.

=== High Court ===
On 28 June 2012, High Court of New Zealand Justice Helen Winkelmann found that the warrants used to seize Dotcom's property were illegal because they were too broad. The Crown later admitted that it was aware that it was using the wrong order while the raid was in progress and that Dotcom should have been given the chance to challenge the seizure. It also admitted to giving seized hard drives to the FBI, who made copies of them in New Zealand and then sent them back to the US. Justice Winkelmann ruled that the handing of hard drives seized by New Zealand police in the raid to the FBI, and the copying of data on them by the FBI, was illegal.

As a result of those rulings, Justice Judith Potter allowed Dotcom to withdraw approximately NZ$6 million (US$4.8 million) on 28 August 2012 of his seized assets, and to sell nine of his cars. The amount released was to cover $2.6 million in existing legal bills, $1 million in future costs, and another $1 million in rent on his New Zealand mansion.

=== Court of Appeal ===
In May 2012, a district court judge ruled that the FBI should hand over all its evidence against Dotcom relating to the extradition bid. The Crown appealed, but the ruling was upheld by the High Court. The Crown appealed again and in March 2013, the Court of Appeal quashed the previous court decisions. Crown lawyer John Pike, on behalf of the US Government, argued that the district court had no power to make disclosure decisions in an extradition case and that "disclosure was extensive and could involve billions of emails". The Court of Appeal agreed stating that extradition hearings were not trials and the full protections and procedures for criminal trials did not apply. Dotcom's lawyer, Paul Davison, QC, appealed to the Supreme Court. In May 2013, the Supreme Court agreed to hear the case, so it will make the final decision on whether Dotcom should receive all the FBI investigation files before the extradition hearing.

A series of subsequent court decisions delayed every attempt to hold a hearing focused on extradition. In March 2013, Dotcom won a Court of Appeal ruling allowing him to sue the New Zealand Government Communications Security Bureau (GCSB), rejecting the attorney's-general appeal against a ruling in December 2012. A month later, Dotcom appeared in court again, seeking compensation from police over the raid on his house, which earlier had been deemed illegal.

=== Confidential settlement with police ===
In November 2017, Dotcom and his former wife Mona accepted a confidential settlement from the police over the raid. The settlement came after a damages claim was filed with the High Court over the "unreasonable" use of force when the anti-terrorism Special Tactics Group raided his mansion in January 2012. Settlements have already been reached between police and Bram van der Kolk and Mathias Ortmann, who were also arrested. The New Zealand Herald reported that their settlements were six-figure sums and "it is likely Dotcom would seek more as the main target in the raid". Commenting on the settlement, Dotcom said: "We were shocked at the uncharacteristic handling of my arrest for a non-violent Internet copyright infringement charge brought by the United States, which is not even a crime in New Zealand".

=== Supreme Court ===
In February 2014, the New Zealand Court of Appeal deemed the raids on Kim Dotcom to be legal but not the FBI's taking of information. Dotcom appealed this decision to the Supreme Court. In December four of the five judges agreed with the Court of Appeal that the raid was legal and ordered Dotcom to pay $35,000 costs. Chief Justice Sian Elias dissented, saying there had been a miscarriage of justice as the search warrant was too broad.

A month before the Supreme Court decision, Dotcom's legal team quit after he had spent $10 million on his defence, financed the Internet Party, then run out of money. When the US tried to have his bail revoked, a new lawyer, Ron Mansfield, helped keep him out of prison. In December 2014, events took another turn when the High Court in Hong Kong ruled that the United States "did not have a clear path to serve a legal summons on Dotcom's filesharing company" and he could take a case to get back $60 million seized by authorities there. In making this decision, Judge Tallentire said, "No one can say when that process of extradition will be completed given the appeal paths open to the various accused. Indeed, no one can say if it will ever be completed".

=== Political fallout ===
After his arrest by the New Zealand police in January 2012, Dotcom had an ongoing dispute with Prime Minister John Key about when Key had first become aware of Dotcom. Dotcom argued that Key had been involved in a plan to allow him into New Zealand so that he could then be extradited to the US to face copyright charges. Key had consistently said he had never heard of Dotcom until the day before the New Zealand police raid on his mansion in Coatesville.

==== Apology for illegal spying on Dotcom ====
On 24 September 2012, Key revealed that, at the request of the police, the New Zealand GCSB had spied on Dotcom to help police locate him and monitor his communications in the weeks prior to the raid on his house. The GCSB are not allowed to spy on New Zealand citizens or permanent residents; Dotcom, though not a citizen, had been granted permanent residency. Three days later, Key apologised for the illegal spying.

==== Application for damages ====
In December 2012, Chief High Court judge Helen Winkelmann ordered the GCSB to "confirm all entities" to which it gave information. This also allowed Dotcom to sue the Crown for damages. The Crown appealed Justice Winkelmann's decision, but in March 2013, the Court of Appeal upheld the High Court's decision. Dotcom was unable to access the information, but Stuart Grieve QC, who was appointed as a Special Advocate, was given access. Dotcom argued in the Court of Appeal that there had been judicial miscarriage, but the court ruled in favour of the GCSB. Dotcom next sought leave to appeal to the Supreme Court but in February 2020, it rejected his appeal and ordered him to pay the GCSB NZ$2,500.

==== Media reaction ====
The mistakes by authorities attracted widespread media coverage and Key's handling of the affair was criticised by opposition parties in Parliament. Political commentator Bryce Edwards criticised the GCSB's involvement and described the prosecution of Dotcom as "the stuff of farce". The Sunday Star-Times commentator Richard Boock compared the Dotcom saga to Watergate and suggested it might eventually 'bring down' John Key. The story made headlines overseas, including in The Wall Street Journal, The New York Times, The Guardian and the Hollywood Reporter which specialises in legal and entertainment issues.

=== On US involvement in his arrest ===
Dotcom claimed to be a legitimate businessman who has been persecuted by the United States government and industry trade groups such as the RIAA and Motion Picture Association of America (MPAA). He blames former US President Barack Obama for colluding with Hollywood to orchestrate his arrest and has spoken out against his negative portrayal in the media. In regard to the illegal spying conducted by GCSB, Dotcom said they were not spying to find out where he was. In May 2013, Dotcom released a 39-page white paper alleging that the US government persecuted him at the behest of Hollywood, in exchange for support for Obama.

Speculation about Hollywood's role in Dotcom's arrest grew when, in September 2012, Key made a four-day visit to meet top studio executives. Key said the trip was intended to promote New Zealand as a good country to produce films, but he was planning to meet with the MPAA, which had described Dotcom as "a career criminal".

In November 2013, The New Zealand Herald journalist David Fisher published The Secret Life of Kim Dotcom: Spies, Lies and the War for the Internet.

== Internet Party ==
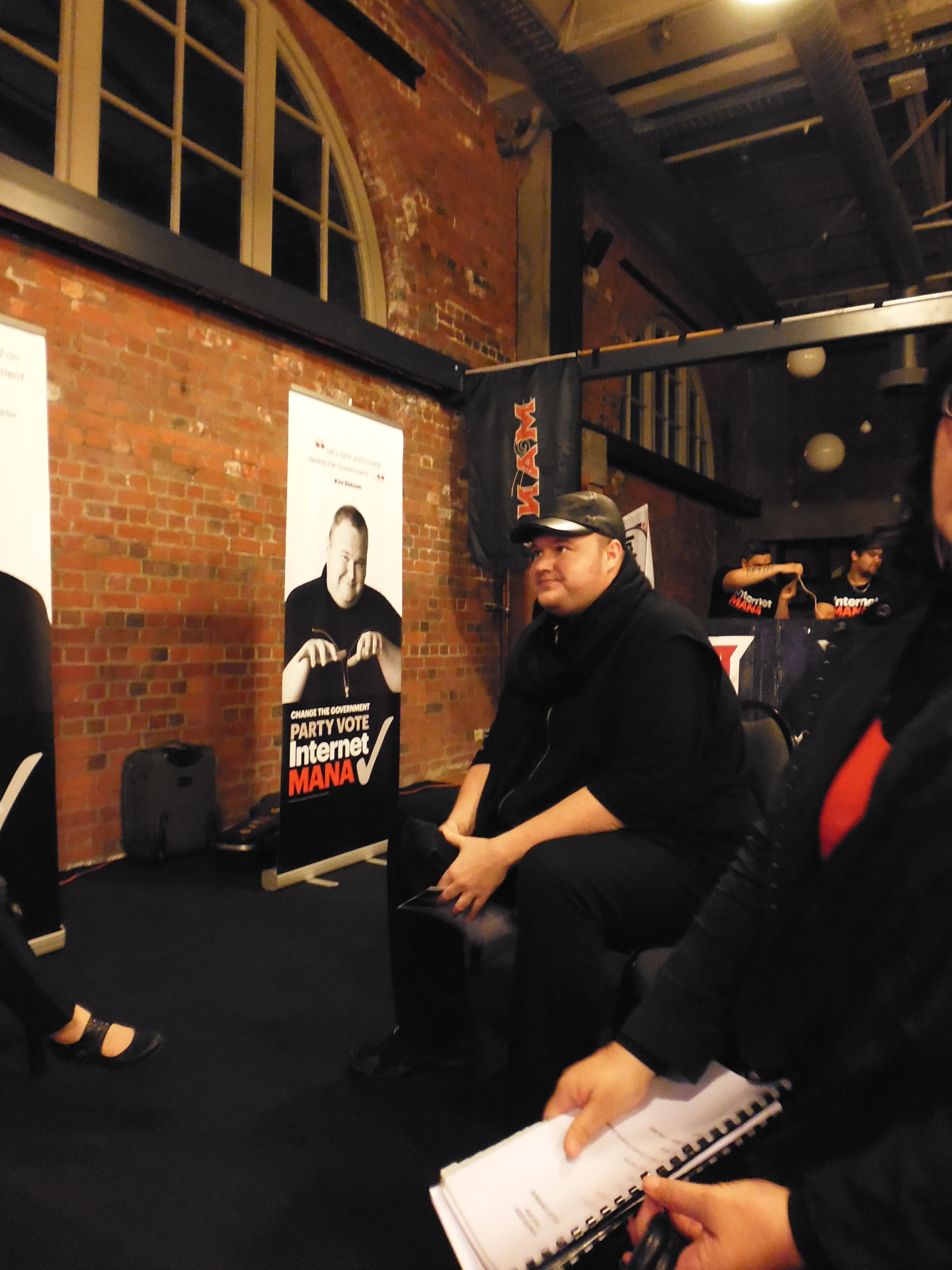
Dotcom at a political rally held by the Internet Party and Mana Movement

In September 2013, Dotcom revealed he aspired to enter New Zealand politics. On 27 March 2014, Dotcom founded the Internet Party. In May 2014, it was announced that the Internet Party would form a political alliance with the Mana Party, led by local activist and sitting Member of Parliament Hone Harawira. The deal was brokered to serve the Mana Party financially, with the combined structure's political campaign in the 2014 general election being primarily funded by Dotcom. In contrast, the fledgling Internet Party was to benefit from the possibility of seats in parliament in the event that the combined structure were to achieve a greater percentage of the country's vote, helped along by the Mana Party's existing seat. Due to his citizenship status, Dotcom was ineligible to become a member of parliament, and Laila Harré, a veteran of left-wing politics and trade unions, was chosen as leader of the Internet Party.

=== The Moment of Truth ===
Kim Dotcom and others at a press conference after The Moment of Truth

On 16 September 2014, Dotcom held an event in the Auckland Town Hall five days before the election in which he promised to provide "absolute proof" that Prime Minister John Key knew about him long before he was arrested. The event was billed as the "Moment of Truth" and included the release of what was claimed to be an email, dated 27 October 2010 from Kevin Tsujihara, the chief executive of Warner Bros. to a senior executive at the Motion Picture Association of America – the lobby group for the Hollywood studios. The New Zealand Herald, which broke the story, contacted Warner Bros., who said the email was a fake.

In the 2014 general election, the joint Internet Party and Mana Movement gained 1.42% of the nationwide party vote but failed to win any seats. Dotcom, who was not a candidate because he is not a New Zealand citizen, sank NZ$3.5 million into the Internet Party, the largest personal contribution to a political party on record in New Zealand, according to the national Electoral Commission. "I take full responsibility for this loss tonight", Dotcom told reporters as election results became clear, "because the brand—the brand Kim Dotcom—was poison for what we were trying to achieve". The Serious Fraud Office investigated the email and determined that it was a forgery.

The media criticised Dotcom for "failing to deliver" at the Moment of Truth after saying for three years that he could prove John Key had lied in relation to his copyright case. After the election, in which the Internet Mana alliance failed to win a seat, public support for Dotcom seemed to dissipate. Dotcom said in January 2015 he had become such "a pariah" in New Zealand that he might as well leave the country.

=== 2017 general election ===
The party remained leaderless until 8 February 2017, when Suzie Dawson was appointed as its new leader for the 2017 general election. The Mana connection was dropped and the party contended as the single entity the Internet Party. The Internet Party ran 8 party list candidates. The party won only 499 votes (0.0%) and failed to win any seats in the New Zealand House of Representatives.

The Internet Party was deregistered on 12 June 2018 because its membership had dropped below the 500 required for registration.

== Extradition ==
=== District court ===
After three years' legal wrangling, involving two Supreme Court cases and ten separate delays, extradition proceedings finally got underway in an Auckland court on 21 September 2015.

The wrangling continued at the hearing with Dotcom and his colleagues saying that they were unable to present a proper defence because the US had threatened to seize any funds they try to spend on international experts in Internet copyright issues. Dotcom's American lawyer, Ira Rothken, said they would need about US$500,000 to get evidence from the appropriate experts. Harvard Law professor Lawrence Lessig, an international expert in copyright and fair use, provided his written opinion for free. He said there were no legal grounds to extradite Dotcom and the allegations and evidence made public by the US Department of Justice "do not meet the requirements necessary to support a prima facie case that would be recognised by United States federal law".

Once the hearing finally got under way, Crown prosecutor Christine Gordon, on behalf of the US Government, called it a "simple scheme of fraud". Defence lawyer Ron Mansfield's 300-page submission began with the argument that the case should be thrown out because the United States Supreme Court ruled in a parallel case in 1982 that copyright infringement was a civil matter and could not be prosecuted as criminal fraud.

The Crown also made numerous references to intercepted Skype conversations between Dotcom and his co-defendants. Gordon said one message written by Dotcom, when translated from German, read: "At some point a judge will be convinced about how evil we are and then we are in trouble." Mansfield said this sentence was used repeatedly by Gordon during her submission "with the knowledge that it would make international media headlines". Mansfield had the passage translated by three independent academics who said it had a very different meaning and should read: "At some stage a judge will be talked into how bad we allegedly are and then it will be a mess."

On 23 December 2015, North Shore District Court Judge Nevin Dawson announced that Dotcom and the three other Megaupload co-founders were eligible for extradition. He said the US had a "large body of evidence" which supported a prima facie case. An immediate appeal was lodged by Dotcom's lawyer.

=== High Court ===
In February 2017, the New Zealand High Court upheld the earlier decision of the district court that Dotcom and his three co-accused could be extradited to the United States. However, Justice Murray Gilbert accepted the argument made by Dotcom's legal team that he and his former Megaupload colleagues cannot be extradited because of copyright infringement. The judge said he made this decision because "online communication of copyright protected works to the public is not a criminal offence in New Zealand". However, Justice Gilbert said there were "general criminal law fraud provisions" in New Zealand law which covered the actions of the accused and they could be extradited on that basis.

Dotcom saw this decision as a major victory saying: "The major part of this litigation has been won by this judgement—that copyright is not extraditable." The ruling opened the door to further appeals because the warrant which was served on him when he was arrested on 20 January 2012, stated he was being charged specifically with "copyright" offences. Both sides are expected to challenge aspects of the ruling before the New Zealand Court of Appeal and eventually the Supreme Court.

=== Court of Appeal ===
On 5 July 2018, the Court of Appeal upheld the High Court's decision that Dotcom and the three co-accused could be extradited to the United States. In particular, the Court, disagreeing with Justice Gilbert, found that, even during the time of Megaupload's operations, it was a criminal offence in New Zealand to possess digital copyrighted works with an intention to disseminate them. Accordingly, Dotcom and his co-accused could be extradited on the basis of copyright infringement to stand trial in the United States. Dotcom's lawyer said that he would appeal the ruling to the Supreme Court.

=== Supreme Court ===
On 4 November 2020, the Supreme Court of New Zealand ruled that Dotcom could be extradited to the United States to face 12 criminal copyright-related charges. However, the Supreme Court also ruled that he and three other co-defendants could challenge the decision through judicial review. In addition, the Supreme Court ruled that the High Court and Court of Appeal had been wrong not to consider their application for judicial review of the original district court decision in 2015 that had first ruled in favour of extradition. Dotcom's lawyer Ron Mansfield described the judgment as a "mixed bag", stating that the Supreme Court had accepted there were "serious procedural issues" while warning that the Court's rejection of Megaupload's "safe harbour" defence would have "an immediate and chilling impact" on the Internet.

The two executives charged for operating Megaupload along with Dotcom, namely Mathias Ortmann and Bram van der Kolk, agreed to a plea bargain with New Zealand and US prosecutors that June, and were sentenced to two years seven months and two years six months in a New Zealand prison respectively on 15 June 2023, leaving Dotcom as the only party still defending his innocence in the case.

=== Extradition order and judicial review ===
On 15 August 2024, the Minister of Justice, Paul Goldsmith, signed Dotcom's extradition order. Dotcom then sought judicial review of the minister's order and of police advice that he should not be charged in New Zealand. After the High Court rejected the request for judicial review, he appealed to the Court of Appeal, which rejected the appeal in July 2026. A further appeal to the Supreme Court is possible.

== Promotion of conspiracy theories ==
=== Seth Rich conspiracy theory ===
In late May 2017, Dotcom posted statements on Twitter and his website claiming he worked with Seth Rich on the Internet Party and had proof that Rich was the source of the 2016 Democratic National Committee email leak. In tweets, Dotcom claimed to be involved with Seth Rich as WikiLeaks' source. Dotcom said he was willing to provide written testimony to the US Congress and that he was willing to provide evidence to US special counsel Robert Mueller if his safe passage from New Zealand to the United States was guaranteed. Seth Rich's family issued a statement calling Dotcom's statements "ridiculous, manipulative, and non-credible" and their spokesman Brad Bauman tweeted to Dotcom that "you have an agenda or are a sociopath".

Dotcom tweeted an alleged FBI file about Seth Rich, warning that it might be fake. He later agreed it was fake, but said there was no need to delete the tweet since he had issued a warning soon after posting it that the file could be fake.

Seth Rich's Gmail account received an emailed invitation from Mega, a file sharing service started by Dotcom following the seizure of Megaupload, but for which he had not worked for years. According to experts and Rich's family, the emailed invitation from welcome@mega.nz appeared to be an attempt to access Rich's email. David Weigel of The Washington Post wrote that Rich's family "worried that Dotcom, or someone eager to prove him right, may have been willing to create a fake archive of emails from Rich, or crack a password to see whether Rich had passed on documents with a Mega account".

=== Russian invasion of Ukraine ===
During the Russo-Ukrainian War, Dotcom has repeatedly spread anti-American and anti-Ukrainian falsehoods, and Russian government propaganda. Critics accuse him of spreading Russian Federation propaganda such as: claims of Nazism in Ukraine, Ukrainian attacks on Russian-speaking minority, claims of American "biolaboratories" in Ukraine, and accusing the US of causing the Russian Federation's invasion of Ukraine.

=== Antisemitic remarks ===
In January 2015, Dotcom criticised Hollywood for what he considered its role in his prosecution by the US government. He tweeted, "What the US Govt is doing reminds me of what I learned in school about Nazi Germany. Ironic, Hollywood is run by mostly Jewish entrepreneurs". New Zealand Jewish Council president Stephen Goodman stated that this was an offensive and inaccurate antisemitic trope.

In an August 2024 Twitter post, Dotcom quoted passages from The Protocols of the Elders of Zion, a discredited antisemitic text purporting to prove the existence of a Jewish conspiracy for world domination.

== Other activities ==
Following the September 11 attacks in the United States, Dotcom launched a group called Young Intelligent Hackers Against Terrorism (YIHAT). He said that he had hacked Sudanese bank accounts belonging to Osama bin Laden and offered a $10 million reward for information leading to bin Laden's capture on his now-defunct kimble.org site.

Dotcom participated in a mock funeral procession for public broadcaster TVNZ 7 in downtown Auckland on the day of its final broadcast. He had warmed to one of its more notable shows, Media7, for its championing of internet freedom and had been interviewed on the show at least once.

In June 2012, Dotcom announced the upcoming launch of Megabox, a music streaming service. That October, he said that Megabox would launch on 19 January 2013, the first anniversary of Megaupload's shutdown.

In August 2012, Dotcom teased an upcoming album with the release of a song titled "Party Amplifier". Dotcom was already in the process of recording the album with friend and producer, Printz Board (who wrote "Yes We Can" for Barack Obama's 2008 election campaign), when he was arrested. Printz and Dotcom recorded more than 20 songs at Neil Finn's Roundhead Studios in Newton, Auckland—one of which is called "Mr President"—an electronica protest song against Barack Obama.

On 2 November, Dotcom announced a new file storage service, similar to Megaupload, using the domain name me.ga. It was to be launched 19 January 2013, but the African state of Gabon, which controls the .ga domain, cancelled the me.ga name on 6 November 2012. The site has since registered the names mega.co.nz and mega.net.nz. The new file hosting service offers file encryption to enhance user privacy and security. As a result of this encryption, Dotcom and mega.co.nz will be unable to determine the content of the uploaded data, allowing for a claim of plausible deniability to be made should new charges arise. In January 2013, Dotcom offered a $13,500 reward to anyone able to defeat the site's security system.

On 4 September 2013, Dotcom stepped down as director of Mega and announced he was working on a music streaming service called Baboom. Dotcom claimed that it would be more advanced than Megabox. Baboom folded in 2015, less than a year after it was founded.

On 25 December 2014, Dotcom helped stop the Christmas DDoS attacks on Xbox Live and PlayStation Network by giving Lizard Squad 3,000 $99 one-year Mega accounts which would then be converted to lifetime accounts worth approximately $300,000.

In 2017, the biographical documentary Kim Dotcom: Caught in the Web, directed by Annie Goldson, premiered at the New Zealand International Film Festival.

In November 2019, Dotcom planned to launch his own cryptocurrency, but due to regulatory uncertainty, the offer was cancelled.

== Discography ==
=== Albums ===
Year	Title	Details	Peak chart positions
Year	Title	Details	NZ
2014	Good Times	Released: 20 January 2014; Label: Kimpire Music	8
"—" denotes a recording that did not chart or was not released in that territory.

=== Singles ===
- "Megaupload" (2011)
- "Mr President" (2012)
- "Precious" (2012)
- "Good Life" (2016)
