= BTJunkie =

Defunct BitTorrent search engine

- BTJunkie Homepage in 2008
- Website type: Torrent index, magnet links provider
- Available in: Multilingual, primarily English
- Dissolved: 5 February 2012
- Website: BTjunkie.org
- Commercial: Yes
- Registration: Free
- Launched: June 2005
- Current status: Closed

BTJunkie was a BitTorrent web search engine operating between 2005 and 2012. It used a web crawler to search for torrent files from other torrent sites and store them on its database. It had nearly 4,000,000 active torrents and about 4,200 torrents added daily (compared to runner-up Torrent Portal with 1,500), making it the largest torrent site indexer on the web in 2006. During 2011, BTJunkie was the 5th most popular BitTorrent site.

== Features ==
BTJunkie indexed both private and public trackers using an automatic web crawler that scanned the Internet for torrent files. Cookies were used to track what a visitor downloaded so that there was no need to register in order to rate torrents. The ratings and feedback given by people were used to help filter and flag malicious torrents uploaded to the website.

== Closure ==
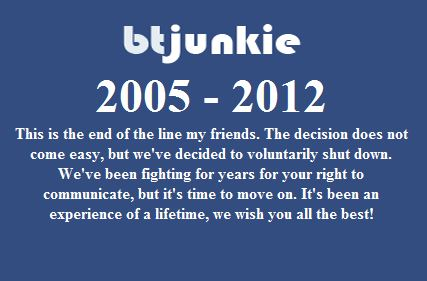
The screenshot of BTJunkie's message for their closure.

On 5 February 2012, BTJunkie announced that it had shut down voluntarily. This was seen as a response to the closure of Megaupload and legal action against The Pirate Bay. The site stated on its main page: "This is the end of the line my friends. The decision does not come easy, but we've decided to voluntarily shut down. We've been fighting for years for your right to communicate, but it's time to move on. It's been an experience of a lifetime, we wish you all the best!"

== See also ==
- Comparison of BitTorrent sites
