= Mega (service) =

Cloud storage and file hosting service

MEGA
- Original author: Kim Dotcom
- Developer: MEGA Cloud Services Limited
- Release: 19 January 2013; 13 years ago
- Written in: PHP, C++, JavaScript, Java, Objective-C
- Operating system: Microsoft Windows; macOS; Linux; Android; iOS; Windows Phone; Browser extension
- Available in: 18 languages
- List of languages English, Arabic, Traditional Chinese, Simplified Chinese, Japanese, Korean, Polish, Dutch, Portuguese, Romanian, French, Russian, German, Spanish, Indonesian, Thai, Italian, Vietnamese.
- Type: Cloud storage; VPN; Video conferencing; File hosting service; Remote backup service; Password manager
- License: MEGA Limited Code Review Licence (source-available freeware)
- Website: mega.io mega.nz
- Repository: github.com/meganz

Mega (stylised as MEGA) is a file hosting service offered by Mega Cloud Services Limited, a company based in Auckland, New Zealand, and owned by Hong Kong-based Cloud Tech Services Limited. The service is offered through web-based apps. MEGA mobile apps are also available for Android and iOS.

The website and service was launched on 19 January 2013, by Kim Dotcom, who had founded the now-defunct service Megaupload, which was seized by the United States government in 2012. However, in 2015 Kim Dotcom had distanced himself from the service and stated that the New Zealand government had seized the shares of a Chinese investor and has control of the site. Mega Limited responded that the authorities have not interfered with its operations.

== History ==
MEGA was launched by Kim Dotcom in 2013 as a cloud service and successor to Megaupload. On 4 July 2013, the MEGA Android application was released on the Google Play marketplace. Four days later, on 8 July 2013, the MEGA software development kit (SDK) and affiliate program was released.

In February 2013, MEGA announced it would be expanding into e-mail, chat, voice, video, and mobile. In December 2014, MEGA said it would "soon" launch a browser-based chat service. In mid-January 2015, MEGA launched MEG Chat in beta, marketed as a web-based, encrypted alternative to applications like Skype and FaceTime.

Files hosted on MEGA are end-to-end encrypted. As a result, the company cannot decrypt or view the content, and cannot be responsible for the contents of uploaded files. In the first few weeks after the MEGA launch, various security problems were found that researchers said an attacker could use to gain access to a logged-in user's files.

On 4 September 2013, Kim Dotcom stepped down as Director of MEGA so he could pursue his political ambitions with the Internet Party. In a later interview with The Washington Post on 7 September, Kim Dotcom announced MEGA was getting 20,000 signups for the service every day. Furthermore, in 2013 MEGA was receiving about 100 DMCA takedowns per day.

On 26 November 2013, the official MEGA iOS application was released on the App Store marketplace. On 20 January 2014, the official MEGAsync application was released for Windows and on 6 September 2014, the official MEGAsync application was released for Linux.

In January 2016, MEGA announced that the service has 35 million registered users that have uploaded 12 billion files. Later in 2016, MEGA Ltd. released the source code to their client-side software under the Mega Limited Code Review License, a source-available software license, on GitHub. This allows independent verification of the correctness and integrity of the implementation of MEGA's cryptographic model and service reliability.

On 5 September 2018, it was reported that the extension on the Chrome Web Store was compromised by the addition of code designed to steal website credentials and cryptocurrency.

In 2021, MEGA added a domain name to include Mega.io and Mega.nz.

== See also ==
- Comparison of file hosting services
- Comparison of file synchronization software
- Comparison of online backup services
