= RapidShare =

Online file hosting service

- Company type: Aktiengesellschaft
- Website type: Online backup service
- Available in: English, French, German and Spanish
- Founded: 27 May 2002; 24 years ago
- Dissolved: 31 March 2015; 11 years ago
- Headquarters: Schochenmühlestrasse 6, 6340 Baar, Switzerland (canton of Zug)
- Advertising: Subscription
- Registration: Optional
- Current status: Offline

RapidShare was an online file hosting service that opened in 2002. In 2009, it was among the Internet's 20 most visited websites and claimed to have 10 petabytes of files uploaded by users with the ability to handle up to three million users simultaneously. Following the takedown of similar service Megaupload in 2012, RapidShare changed its business model to deter the use of its services for distribution of files to large numbers of anonymous users and to focus on personal subscription-only cloud-based file storage. Its popularity fell sharply as a result and, by the end of March 2015, RapidShare ceased to operate and it is defunct. As of 2017, Rapidshare AG was acquired by Kingsley Global.

== History ==
RapidShare was founded by Christian Schmid in Mulheim, Germany, initially as ezShare later Rapid Share, a file hosting service for his RapidForum web forum hosting services. In 2004, he started the company RapidShare AG, which went online in August 2004 then moved its premises to Baar, Switzerland in 2006. Schmid avoids the public eye, but took over management of the company after longtime CEO and COO Bobby Chang left in April 2010.

RapidShare's original site was RapidShare.de. Later a second site, RapidShare.com, was started. It operated in parallel with RapidShare.de for several years. On 1 March 2010, RapidShare.de was shut down, and users visiting the site were forwarded to RapidShare.com. Files hosted on RapidShare.de were no longer available for download.

In 2010, RapidShare was said to have hundreds of millions of visitors per month and to be among the 50 most popular Internet sites.

Lawsuits by the owners of copyrighted content shared via RapidShare, and the takedown of file hoster Megaupload, caused RapidShare to revise its business model. The company changed its focus to B2B cloud storage services, but a drop in revenue led to a reduction in staffing by three quarters in May 2013. By 2014 its Alexa ranking had sunk below 1,400.

In late February 2014, the website PCTipp.ch, based on reports from a former RapidShare employee "MarkusP," stated that RapidShare had presented a "quit or be fired" ultimatum to 23 of its 24 employees (already down from 60 employees just two years before) and that most had resigned. The rest, save one, had their contracts terminated. As of mid-March, RapidShare was reported as operating with only one employee, a support person who answered the telephone and managed customers and accounts. The product development team was no more. On 13 March 2014, RapidShare announced price increases for its paid services of about 150%. Free users would continue to be able to use RapidShare, but their download speeds and capacity were sharply curtailed.

On 10 February 2015, RapidShare announced on its home page that it would shut down its services permanently on 31 March 2015. After that date none of the data it hosted would be available, even to the customers who uploaded it. On 31 March 2015, the site home page displayed a notice about the service's closing.

== Operation and services ==
Upon uploading, the user was supplied with a unique download URL which enabled anyone with whom the uploader shared the URL to download the file. No user was allowed to search RapidShare's servers for content.

In April 2008, RapidShare had 5.4 petabytes of storage for users. In March 2010, it stated, after a 120 Gbit/s upgrade, to have 600 Gbit/s of bandwidth.

Registration and payment allowed benefits such as unlimited download speed, immediate download (instead of experiencing a waiting period), download of several files simultaneously, queue skipping, the facility to interrupt and restart downloads, uploading, downloading bigger files up to 2 GB and to store up to 50 GB of data for an unlimited period.

Until 1 July 2010, RapidShare operated an incentive program that rewarded uploaders with "RapidPoints" according to the number of times those files were downloaded by others; the points were redeemable for premium RapidShare subscriptions. RapidShare discontinued the program to avoid the impression it rewarded its users for uploading copyrighted material.

Downloads by people without a current premium account subscription were subject to restrictions such as an enforced wait of several minutes between downloads. The length of the wait varied over the years, from 15 minutes to over 2.5 hours.

== Software ==
RapidShare offered two computer programs to simplify file managing:

=== RapidShare Uploader ===
This software allowed queuing of uploads. However, it could not resume interrupted uploads. It was available for Windows and ran without installation.

=== RapidShare Manager ===
This software had many more features than the Uploader, especially queuing and resuming the upload as well as the downloads. The version linked on the site worked with Windows Vista and 7, Mac, and Linux. An older official client was also available for Windows XP.

RapidShare did not restrict automatic downloads to their downloader, however, they did not provide technical support to third-party downloaders as they did for RapidShare Manager.

== Legal issues ==
On 19 January 2007, the German performance rights organisation GEMA claimed to have won a temporary injunction against both RapidShare.de and RapidShare.com. "The latter is said to have used copyright protected works of GEMA members in an unlawful fashion."

RapidShare started to check newly uploaded files against a database of files already reported as illegal. By comparing the files' MD5-hash the site would now prevent illegal files from being reuploaded. While this would be sufficient under United States law, it was later established in court that under German law it is not. That decision forced RapidShare to check all the uploaded files before publishing them.

In April 2009, RapidShare handed over to major record labels the personal details of uploaders who uploaded copyright-protected files. The incident is reported to have arisen due to a leak of a pre-release copy of metal band Metallica's Death Magnetic album.

A month later, RapidShare stated on their website: "we will not spy out the files that our clients faithfully upload onto RapidShare, not now nor in future. We are against upload control and guarantee you that your files are safe with us and will not be opened by anyone else than yourself, unless you distribute the download link."

Six global publishers obtained an injunction against Swiss-based RapidShare AG. Plaintiffs in the case were Bedford, Freeman and Worth Publishing Group, LLC a subsidiary of Macmillan; Cengage Learning Inc.; Elsevier Inc; John Wiley & Sons, Inc.; The McGraw-Hill Companies, Inc.; and Pearson Education, Inc. The judgment handed down by a German court in Hamburg on 10 February 2010, and effective on 17 February 2010, ordered RapidShare to implement measures to prevent illegal file sharing of the 148 copyright-protected works cited in the lawsuit, which was filed on 4 February 2010. The court ruled that RapidShare must monitor its site to ensure the copyrighted material is not being uploaded and prevent unauthorized access to the material by its users. The company will be subject to substantial fines for non-compliance.

The US government's congressional international anti-piracy caucus stated that the site was "overwhelmingly used for the global exchange of illegal movies, music and other copyrighted works".

The Düsseldorf higher regional court twice overturned injunctions filed against RapidShare by Capelight Pictures, a German film and DVD rental company. The court declared that the file host could not be held liable for publication of copyright protected material by third parties and revoked the injunction initially upheld by the Düsseldorf district court in the main proceedings. The court also indicated that a file host is not obliged to use a word filter as this would also prevent legal copying for private use.

In May 2010, the District Court Southern District of California rejected an injunction against RapidShare filed by the publisher of online erotic magazine Perfect 10. The presiding judge declared that the plaintiff had failed to make a credible case that RapidShare had directly infringed copyright or supported copyright violation.

In a 2009–2010 case brought against RapidShare by Atari Europe, the Düsseldorf higher regional court concluded on appeal that illegal use of RapidShare was by a small minority of its users and that to assume otherwise amounted to "a general suspicion of shared hosting services and their users that cannot be justified". The court also observed that the site removed copyrighted material upon request and did not provide search facilities for illegal material. It concluded that the plaintiff's suggestions for preventing sharing of copyrighted material were "unreasonable or pointless". It also judged that RapidShare could not be held liable for copyright infringements by its users, and that while the service was legal, a minority of illegal use could not be prevented by other measures proposed - for example keyword-based filtering (which could impair legal use), manual review of uploads (not feasible), or IP address analysis (as IP addresses can change frequently).

In December 2010, in response to the congressional international anti-piracy caucus' press release and the German court ruling, RapidShare enlisted the services of Dutko Worldwide to lobby its interests in the United States Congress.

In March 2012, the Hamburg higher regional court upheld three earlier decisions that the file hoster could be held liable for publication of copyright protected material by third parties.

In September 2018, over 3 years after its demise, Schmid, his wife, Alexandra, and one of their former lawyers were tried by the public prosecutor in Zug, Switzerland, where Rapidshare remained incorporated, on behalf of several copyright holders seeking financial restitution for commercial assistance to copyright violation. The trio were found not guilty in January 2021.

== See also ==
- FilesTube
