= Countries blocking access to The Pirate Bay =

Various countries have blocked access to The Pirate Bay website

This is a list of countries where at least one Internet service provider (ISP) formerly or currently censors the popular file sharing website The Pirate Bay (TPB).

== Argentina ==
On 30 June 2014, the Argentine CNC (National Communications Commission) ordered the blocking of all The Pirate Bay domains. The order originated as a product of a trial between the site and the CAPIF (Argentinian Chamber of Phonograms Productors). With this order, the CNC made ISPs block the IP in which The Pirate Bay operates, and 12 different The Pirate Bay domains.

== Australia ==
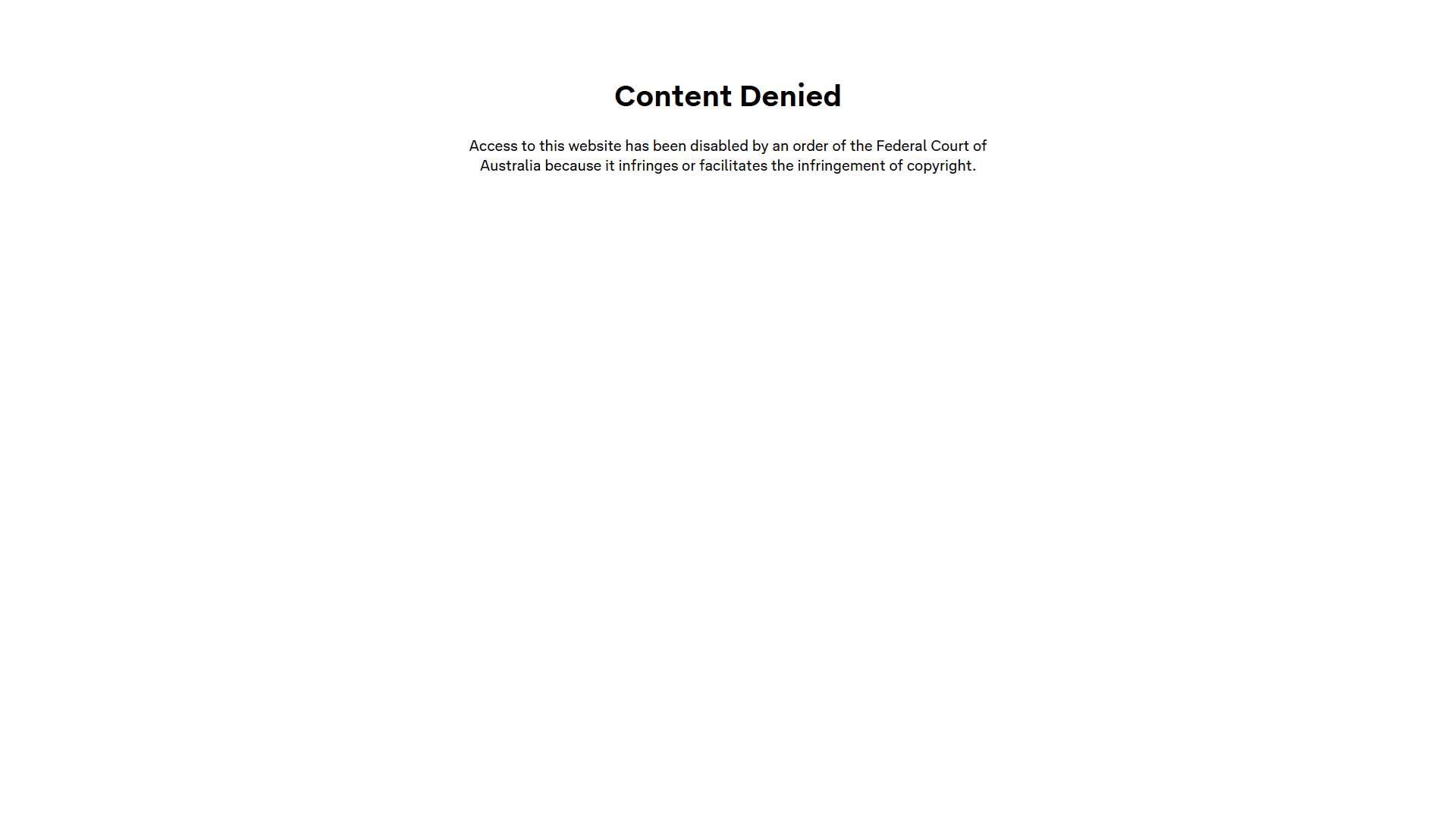
Telstra Corporation Ltd v Commonwealth Broadband blocking TPB in November 2025

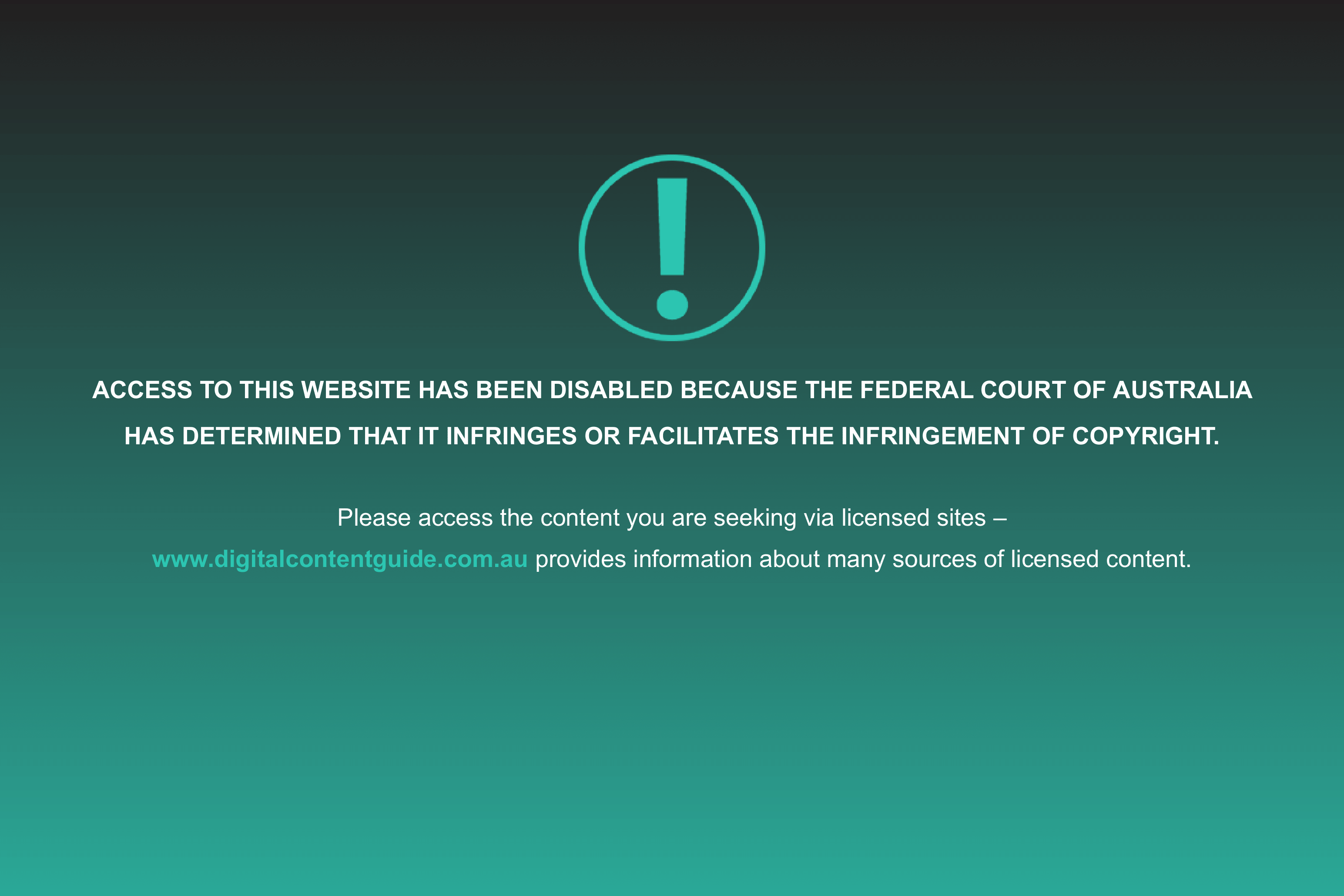
Optus Australia new blocking screen (2021)

In September 2014, the Australian government indicated that it was undergoing discussions regarding whether ISPs should be forced to block popular torrent sites, including The Pirate Bay.

On 15 December 2016, the Federal Court of Australia came to the decision to proceed with the block, forcing ISPs to block access to The Pirate Bay, isoHunt, and SolarMovie, as well as the already defunct Torrentz and TorrentHound, by 5 January. Justice Nicholas said "I am satisfied that the facilitation of the infringement of copyright is flagrant, and that the operator of the TPB sites has shown a blatant and wilful disregard for the rights of copyright owners." Despite some success with ISPs blocking access, sites such as The Pirate Bay are still easily accessed by VPNs or changing DNS.

== Austria ==
In August 2015, the Commercial Court of Vienna ordered local internet provider A1 Telekom Austria to block subscriber access to The Pirate Bay, alongside 1337x, isoHunt, and h33t.to.

On 30 May 2016, this decision was overruled by the Vienna Higher Regional Court, allowing local ISPs to unblock the aforementioned sites.

Following a November 2017 ruling by the Austrian Supreme Court, local ISPs are once again required to block access to these websites.

== Belgium ==
After the founders of The Pirate Bay lost their 2009 trial, the Belgian Anti-Piracy Foundation (BAF) began arguing for two ISPs – Belgacom and Telenet – to block subscriber access to the site. After year-long negotiations broke down, the result was legal action. In July 2010, the Antwerpse Handelsrechtbank (Antwerp Commercial Court) ruled that neither ISP would have to block The Pirate Bay and went on to describe the notion of wholesale site blocking as "disproportionate". The ISPs said that it was not their position to decide which sites can and can not be accessed by their users. BAF accused them of providing a safe-haven to The Pirate Bay and filed an appeal.

In October 2011, the Antwerp Court of Appeal overruled the decision of the Commercial Court and ordered Belgacom and Telenet to initiate DNS blockades of 11 domains connected to The Pirate Bay within 14 days or face fines. A Pirate Bay spokesperson said that this measure would only have the opposite effect, as there are many ways to circumvent it, commenting: "This will just give us more traffic, as always. Thanks for the free advertising." The court order listed domain names to block, which all included "www." The equivalent URLs without "www." were also blocked by ISPs who wished to comply with the "spirit of the law", although the court order did not specify this. NURPA, a nonprofit Belgian advocacy group which promotes and protects digital rights, freedom of expression, privacy and civil liberties, condemned the decision, saying: "The decision of the Antwerp Court of Appeal in the case against Belgacom BAF / Telenet sets a dangerous precedent for blocking of content by ISPs in Belgium. It is incompatible with the doctrine of proportionality advocated by the European Court of Human Rights."

On 5 October 2011, The Pirate Bay registered the domain name depiraatbaai.be and baiedespirates.be, allowing Belgian users to access the site again, without using alternative DNS providers.

On 18 April 2012, TorrentFreak reported that these two alternate domain names were also blocked, presumably added to the already existing court order.

== Brazil ==
In the week following 8 July 2021, the Ministry of Justice and Public Security launched Operation 404 against Internet piracy.

On 13 July, Claro, Oi, and TIM, the three main ISPs in the country, performed a DNS block of several torrent websites, including The Pirate Bay, in nine Brazilian states.

== Bulgaria ==
In February 2020, the Bulgarian Association of Music Producers, with support from IFPI, launched legal action for local ISPs to block The Pirate Bay along with local torrent website Zamunda. On 31 May 2023, three ISPs were ordered to block the two sites within 6 months.

== China ==
The site was blocked for a short time in November 2008 in the People's Republic of China with other BitTorrent sites, apparently unblocked and blocked again – as of January 2017, it remains inaccessible from mainland China.

== Denmark ==
On 5 February 2008, the district court of Frederiksberg, Copenhagen ruled that one of Denmark's largest ISPs, DMT2-Tele2, was assisting its customers in copyright infringement by allowing the use of The Pirate Bay, and that they were to block access to the site. Although the ISP had decided to challenge the verdict with support from the Danish Telecommunication Industries Association, they complied with it and blocked access to The Pirate Bay. The Pirate Bay reacted by creating an alternate site with instructions on how to work around the block, while the IFPI welcomed the block and encouraged other ISPs to follow suit. The verdict was affirmed in the Eastern High Court of Denmark on 26 November 2008. Following the court's decision, TDC, Denmark's largest ISP and owner of most of the cables, decided to block access to The Pirate Bay as a preventive measure. Other Danish ISPs have commented that they would prefer not to intervene in their customers' communication, but have reluctantly put the block in effect in order to avoid fines. Tele2's owner Telenor in turn appealed the high court verdict to the Supreme Court of Denmark, which in April 2009 accepted the case. In May 2010, the Court denied the appeal and ordered Telenor to continue blocking.

== Finland ==
On 26 October 2011, the district court of Helsinki ruled that Elisa Oyj, one of the major ISPs in Finland, must cease to provide copyrighted material from The Pirate Bay website by 18 November 2011 with the threat of a €100,000 fine. On 9 January 2012, Elisa enabled DNS- and IP address–based ban to thepiratebay.org. Elisa has filed a complaint on the district court ruling. Even DNA and Telia (formerly Sonera) are blocking access after a ruling from District Court of Helsinki in 2012. Together these 3 operators, Elisa, Telia and DNA have over 80% of the Finnish internet operator market.

== France ==
On 4 December 2014, the Paris High Court requested the major ISPs to block The Pirate Bay within the next two weeks.

== Germany ==
On 13 May 2010, the Hamburg District Court ordered an injunction against CB3Rob Ltd & Co KG (CyberBunker) and its operator, Sven Olaf Kamphuis, restraining them from connecting The Pirate Bay site to the Internet. The injunction application was brought by the Motion Picture Association's member companies.

== Greece ==
In Greece, from 15 February 2010 until late March 2010, the ISPs Tellas/WIND Hellas blocked the site, as a side effect of blocking applied in Italy, since apparently traffic is routed via the sister network Wind Italy servers. As of 9 November 2018, all Greek providers are ordered by law to block access to The Pirate Bay for a minimum of three years.

== Iceland ==
In October 2013, several copyright organizations, including STEF and SMAIS, requested an injunction for ISPs to block The Pirate Bay and local BitTorrent tracker Deildu.net. However, the original blocking request was rejected and since it took 12 days to refer to the District Court of Reykjavik, more than the maximum seven days, as a result, the injunction was dismissed in March 2014 and only STEF could claim injunctive relief.

On 14 October 2014, the Reykjavik District Court ordered an injunction against ISPs Vodafone and Hringdu to block Deildu.net and The Pirate Bay.

== India ==
The Pirate Bay, and some other file-sharing and video streaming sites, were blocked in India, from 4 May 2012, under orders of the Department of Telecom (DoT) without any stated reasons or prior warnings. The block was due to a Madras High Court issued John Doe order taken by Chennai-based Copyright Lab. The block was enforced by a number of ISPs, including Airtel, Reliance Communications, Tikona Digital Networks, Aircel, MTNL, BSNL and Vodafone. Some ISPs, such as You Broadband, Nextra Broadband and Hathway, however, did not enforce the block. As of 19 May 2012, the site was still blocked with the error message "This website/URL has been blocked until further notice either pursuant to Court orders or on the Directions issued by the Department of Telecommunications". In May 2012, the server of Reliance Communications was hacked by an anonymous group as a protest and to show the weakness of the security used to implement the block.

On 22 June 2012, the Madras High Court overturned the block, and clarified that only specific web addresses (or URLs) carrying the illegal copies should be blocked and not the entire website. The decision restored access in India to video and file-sharing sites, including The Pirate Bay.

In July 2014, the site was blocked again due to infringement caused in the policies regarding FIFA broadcasting activities in countries, with a "This site has been blocked as per the instructions of Competent Authority" message being displayed to visitors. A number of ISPs including the state-owned BSNL, Airtel and Vodafone India continue to block the website though they have ceased to display any custom message when a user heads to the Pirate Bay website. However, the website continues to be accessible on most other ISPs.

== Indonesia ==
The Pirate Bay has been blocked by numerous internet ISPs in Indonesia. ISPs blocking it including the semi-private telecommunication Company of Indonesia (Telkom Indonesia) via its wholly owned ISP TelkomSpeedy and possibly some other ISPs. Internet users in Indonesia accessing this website (without proxy clients) will be redirected instead to another website named Internet Positif which is maintained by Kemkominfo (Ministry of Telecommunication and information of Indonesia). The website itself states that The Pirate Bay is blocked due to it having malicious contents such as pornography materials along with others and also violating Indonesian Copyright law, Act No. 28 of 2014.

== Ireland ==
In January 2009, Irish ISP Eircom, Ireland's largest internet provider, was taken to court by the four large music labels EMI, Sony, Universal Music Group and Warner Music Group in order to have the ISP monitor its customers and spot illegal file sharing. After eight court days, the parties reached a settlement to introduce a graduated response policy to disconnect customers involved in copyright infringing activity. The Irish Recorded Music Association continues to negotiate with other ISPs for a similar agreement. On 21 February 2009, Eircom, however, declared that access to The Pirate Bay would soon be blocked altogether, but retracted that on 24 February 2009, stating that they would not block without a court order. Eircom reversed themselves again on 20 August 2009, announcing that they would block the website starting in September. As of 1 September 2009 Eircom blocked access to The Pirate Bay, though it is still accessible via proxy servers, and still accessible in Ireland to subscribers of other ISP companies.

In a judgment given by Irish High Court Justice Peter Charleton, on 16 April 2010, ruled that the three strikes policy was legal and described the Pirate Bay as "a site dedicated, on a weird ideological basis, to basically stealing the copyright owned by the plaintiffs in mainly musical works." Following the ruling, the judge was subjected to threats that his life would be "wrecked by computer".

In April 2011 the Advocate General of the European Court of Justice stated in a written opinion that from his view no ISP can be required to filter the Internet, and particularly not to enforce copyright law. In November 2011 European Court of Justice mainly confirmed this opinion in a ruling.

As of December 2011, a ruling against Eircom's "three strikes" anti-online file sharing system was passed due to privacy concerns with collecting of IP addresses.

On 12 June 2013, EMI, Sony, Warner Music and Universal won a court order for UPC, Imagine, Vodafone, Digiweb, Hutchison 3G Ltd and Telefónica O2 Ireland Ltd. to block access to The Pirate Bay, and have 30 days to do so.

== Iran ==
As per August 2022, The Pirate Bay is blocked in Iran, although still accessible via proxy servers.

== Italy ==
In mid-2008, following the criminal charges raised in Sweden, the Italian Federation against Musical Piracy in Milan requested action in Italy. The deputy public prosecutor pursued the complaint in the Bergamo Court for Preliminary Investigations, which on 1 August 2008 decreed to block access from Italian ISPs to all Pirate Bay addresses. The ruling was based on prevention of copyright violations by the site's users in Italian territory. Once the block had been put in effect, The Pirate Bay responded on 10 August 2008 by posting instructions to work around the block and later by creating a separate site for Italians, but shortly afterwards the ISPs also blocked the alternate site. Some ISPs had implemented the block by redirecting The Pirate Bay traffic to a site owned by the IFPI. Italian security expert Matteo Flora suggested that by having the page redirected this way, IFPI could access Italian users' cookies and impersonate them on the official The Pirate Bay website. Two Italian IT lawyers Giovanni Battista Gallus and Francesco Micozzi together with forensics expert Matteo Flora appealed to the Bergamo court, which reviewed the case and on 24 September 2008 quashed the original ruling. The decision lifting the block was based on the applicability of the "preventive seizure" section of the Italian Code of Criminal Procedure, which cannot force actions on parties unrelated to the potential offence (ISPs to filter users' traffic). With the April 2009 verdict in Sweden as a precedent, the Bergamo prosecutor appealed the Italian ruling in the Supreme Court of Cassation to reinstate the block. In September 2009, the Supreme Court annulled the decision to overturn the block, and the case was again reviewed in the Bergamo court. On 8 February 2010, the web site was blocked again by the Italian Supreme Court. At least since 2014 the site is blocked in Italy only at dns level on some ISPs. It is still fully accessible from the lesser known ones.

== Kuwait ==
In February 2008, the Ministry of Information and Culture ordered ISPs to block 20 torrent sites, including The Pirate Bay, with the aim of blocking all torrent sites. ISP United Networks notified "The Ministry of information has today sent us a letter announcing they will be blocking all Torrent sites. This is due to piracy laws of the State of Kuwait and to protect the intellectual property of the pirated content on these sites." It is currently unknown whether any other ISPs have blocked the websites, or if any of the blocks are still in effect.

== Malaysia ==
In June 2011, the Malaysian Communications and Multimedia Commission ordered the blocking of The Pirate Bay along with several other file-hosting websites via a letter, dated 30 May, to all Malaysian ISPs for violating Section 41 of the Copyright Act 1987, which deals with illegally copied content. The block was, however, removed in July 2014. Malaysia once again has blocked The Pirate Bay as of 4 June 2015. As of 2018, it doesn't seem to be blocked anymore due to a possible lack of interest and/or the change of government policies.

== Netherlands ==
On 21 July 2005, the Amsterdam district court held a preliminary injunction hearing against the persons thought responsible for The Pirate Bay. The hearing followed a subpoena from the Dutch record industry trade association BREIN, who had an urgent complaint of intermediary copyright infringement. The defendants did not attend the hearing and hadn't arranged representation, so on 30 July 2009 the court entered an in absentia default judgment against them, accepting the complainants demands. It ruled that Neij, Kolmisoppi and Warg are "to stop and keep stopped the infringements on copyright and related rights of Stichting Brein (foundation Brain) in the Netherlands" within 9 August 2009, or face daily penalties of EUR 30,000, up to a maximum total of EUR 3,000,000. They were also ordered to pay the cost of the proceedings. In a separate case handled at the same time, the court ordered the same fines for the expected new owner of The Pirate Bay, Global Gaming Factory X, were it not to stop the copyright infringements after the site's takeover. According to BREIN director Tim Kuik, it is the first time a foreign website has been ordered to block access from the Netherlands. The BREIN, however, waived the payment of damages for August and allowed the site to stay online until its expected change of owners at the end of August 2009.

On 2 October 2009, The Pirate Bay's hosting services moved to Ukraine and their traffic was routed through The Netherlands, but BREIN contacted the ISP NForce and service was stopped. Subsequently, The Pirate Bay moved their hosting location to a nuclear bunker owned by CyberBunker just outside Kloetinge in the south of the Netherlands.

On 11 January 2012, two Dutch ISPs (Ziggo and XS4ALL) were ordered by a court in The Hague to disable lookups of The Pirate Bay's domain names and to block access to The Pirate Bay's IP addresses. They started doing so on 31 January 2012. Pending the results of the appeal they needed to comply the court order. On 10 May 2012, five more ISPs were ordered to block the site (specifically UPC, KPN, T-Mobile, Tele 2 and Telfort). After a complaint by BREIN, a court in The Hague ordered the Pirate Party of the Netherlands to stop publicizing ways to circumvent the block. This included linking to a proxy server being offered by the Pirate Party of the Netherlands, and the Party claimed that it was also legally prevented from giving a link to the Tor project.

On 28 January 2014, The Court of Appeal in The Hague judged that the ongoing blockade was ineffective and, in addition, easy to circumvent, and decided that Ziggo and XS4ALL were no longer required to block access to The Pirate Bay. On 13 November 2015, the Supreme Court held that the Court of Appeal's findings on the effectiveness of the blockade were contrary to the case law of the European Court of Justice and referred preliminary questions to the ECJ, asking whether the activities of The Pirate Bay constitute a "communication to the public" and, if not, whether a blocking injunction can nevertheless be granted against ISPs who facilitate infringing activities.

European judges ruled in 2017 that the previous 2012 ruling was not in violation of European law, thus allowing for national courts in the European Union to instigate web-blocks on copyright grounds. The case was then relayed back to the Dutch Supreme Court, which as of January 2018 was still deciding on the matter. However, as the European Court order had now invalidated the 2014 decision, ISPs were yet again forced to block the Pirate Bay pending the Supreme Court decision. On 12 January, this block was extended to the ISPs KPN, Tele2, T-Mobile, Zeelandnet and CAIW. Vodafone was indirectly affected since its merge with Ziggo.

== Norway ==
On 2 September 2015 came the news that Norway would ban The Pirate Bay, including 6 other web pages. The case against ISPs Telenor, NextGenTel, Get, Altibox, TeliaSonera, Homenet and ice.net. Smaller ISPs weren't charged, and some, such as Lynet, have rejected blocking access to their customers since they approve of a free internet and were not involved in the case. The blocking is done using DNS blocking.

On 11 September 2015, Norway's two biggest internet providers Telenor and Altibox blocked their users access to The Pirate Bay. Film producers like Warner Bros., SF Norway and Disney, got favor in court on all counts in a lawsuit against several of the largest Internet providers in Norway.

Asker and Bærum District Court rejected demands from the recording artists' copyright organisation TONO against Norway's largest internet provider, Telenor, to have The Pirate Bay blocked. In a court ruling on 6 November 2009 the court stated that in today's society it would be unnatural to demand of a private company that it should make judgments on whether a website complied with the law, since making such judgments is considered the responsibility of the authorities.

== Pakistan ==
On July 23, 2013, Pakistani ISPs blocked The Pirate Bay, along with KickassTorrents, Torrentz, ExtraTorrent, Mininova, and private tracker TorrentLeech for unknown reasons. The blocks were later removed the following day. However, although ISP PTCL did not detail the issues but only announce that the sites were blocked, it could be connected to PTCL capping P2P connections to conserve bandwidth in March of the same year.

== Portugal ==
In December 2014, Vodafone blocked thepiratebay.se, instead redirecting to the site http://mobilegen.vodafone.pt/denied/dn with the message "O site que pretende consultar encontra-se bloqueado por determinação judicial." (The site you are trying to access is blocked by court order.)

Following a decision of the Intellectual Property Court made on 28 February 2015, MEO, Cabovisão, and NOS blocked thepiratebay.se at DNS level, showing a similar message "O site a que se pretende aceder encontra-se bloqueado na sequência do cumprimento de ordem judicial" (The site you want to access is blocked as a result of compliance with court order.)

== Qatar ==
File sharing and video streaming sites like The Pirate Bay, have been blocked in Qatar.

== Romania ==
RCS & RDS, UPC Romania, Telekom Romania, Nextgen Communication, Digital Cable Systems and AKTA Telekom will block customers access to three piracy sites for movies and serials (www.filmehd.net, www.filmeonline2013.biz and the torrents www.thepiratebay.org) being no longer allowed for Internet users in Romania, and operators must prohibit access to the related web addresses from the system. The decision was made in court by several film production companies (Twentieth Century Fox Film Corporation, Universal City Studios Productions LLP, Universal Cable Productions LLC, Warner Bros Entertainment INC, Paramount Pictures Corporation, Disney Enterprises, Columbia Pictures Industries and Sony Pictures Television). According to the court's decision, "It is being permanently blocked by the method of DNS blocking access of the clients for the fixed access internet services to the websites currently accessible at the online locations indicated above. The decision is made by putting the solution at the disposal of the parties through the court registry, 05.11.2018 ". The decision is not final and may be appealed.

== Russia ==
The Pirate Bay was blocked in June 2015 by several big ISPs throughout the country as the state blocks sites that contain files or references to files that infringe copyright laws.

== Saudi Arabia ==
The Saudi Arabian Ministry of Culture and Information blocked The Pirate Bay, along with multiple other torrenting sites, in August 2014.

== Singapore ==
The Singapore government had planned to block websites, including TPB, facilitating copyright infringement, so the Copyright Act 2014 was proposed to be amended in August 2014. However, on 29 November 2014, the Copyright Act amendment was cancelled.

In February 2016, a Singapore court ruled that copyright infringing websites must be blocked.

In a sweeping move, the Singapore Government ordered all Singapore ISPs to block 53 sites including TPB following an application by the MPAA. The ISPs are Singtel, M1, Starhub, MyRepublic and Viewqwest

== Slovakia ==
For several days in early December 2015, UPC's Slovak division blocked the site as a side effect of UPC Austria blocking the site based on a court order, since the DNS server pointed at a data center in Vienna. As of 9 December, the block was resolved after the ISP switched to a new DNS server.

== Spain ==
Since January 2015, Vodafone Spain has blocked thepiratebay.org as requested by the Ministry of Interior. Since 29 March 2015 thepiratebay has been blocked on multiple URLs from all ISPs According to the Ministry of Culture and Sport, procedures took place between June 2014 and November 2018 to block several associated domains, including those ending in .se, .org, .net, and .com.

== Sweden ==
In May 2010, The Pirate Bay's Swedish ISP lost an appeal against an order to stop providing service to the site. Although the service provider had already complied with an earlier order in August 2009 and The Pirate Bay was thereafter hosted elsewhere, in June 2010 the ISP chose also to block their customers from accessing The Pirate Bay in its new location. One of the judges in the case later commented that the court's order didn't require the ISP to control their customers' access to the site, but the ISP wanted to avoid any risk. On 13 February 2017 Sweden's Patent and Market Court of Appeal decided that a broadband provider must block its customers from accessing file sharing site The Pirate Bay, overruling a district court ruling to the contrary from 2015.

== Turkey ==
The Pirate Bay was blocked in Turkey for the first time in September 2007. The ban had been lifted after almost a year before the Presidency of Telecommunication and Communication of Turkey banned the website again on 30 October 2014. As of 2018, despite mass censorship, the site itself is accessible once again.

== United Arab Emirates ==
The Pirate Bay was blocked in the United Arab Emirates from September 2013. The ban has since been lifted except for the porn section. A thepiratebay.ae mirror was recently created to circumvent blockade.

== United Kingdom ==
On 20 February 2012, the High Court in London ruled that The Pirate Bay facilitates copyright infringement. The operators of The Pirate Bay were not represented at the hearing. On 30 April 2012 Justice Arnold ordered Sky, EE, TalkTalk, O2 and Virgin Media to block access to the site. BT "requested a few more weeks to further consider its position." Virgin Media began blocking access to the site on 2 May 2012. A source at The Pirate Bay claimed that it had received 12 million more visitors on the day after the ban than it had ever received before, commenting "We should write a thank you note to the BPI."

BT has adapted its Cleanfeed system to enforce the block. The Pirate Bay commented "As usual there are easy ways to circumvent the block. Use a VPN service to be anonymous and get an uncensored Internet access, you should do this anyhow." A study by Lund University suggested a 40% rise in the number of 15- to 25-year-olds using VPNs since 2009.

On 10 June 2012, TalkTalk began blocking access to the website for its UK customers. O2 and Sky Broadband have implemented the block, and on 19 June were joined by BT. Attempting to access The Pirate Bay via BT will produce the message "Error – site blocked". Other ISPs show a message explaining the court order, with The Pirate Bay logo and a link to the BPI website.

In mid-July, ISP data suggested that P2P traffic in the UK had dipped 11% just after the block, but then swiftly recovered to nearly the level before the block was enforced. "...volumes are already pretty much back to where they were before." The ISP released the figures anonymously to the BBC.

In December 2012, a proxy of The Pirate Bay website run by the Pirate Party UK was shut down following a threat of legal action by the British Phonographic Industry.

== See also ==
- Internet censorship circumvention
- Legal aspects of file sharing
- Trade group efforts against file sharing
