= Maverick (company) =

American entertainment company

- Industry: Entertainment
- Founded: 1992; 34 years ago
- Founder: Madonna; Frederick DeMann; Veronica "Ronnie" Dashev
- Defunct: 2009
- Headquarters: Beverly Hills, California, U.S.
- Products: Management; Music; Entertainment; Film; Television programs Music videos
- Website: maverick.com

Maverick was an American entertainment company founded in 1992 by Time Warner and run by recording artist Madonna, as well as Frederick DeMann and Veronica "Ronnie" Dashev. It included a record label (Maverick Records), a film production company (Maverick Films), book publishing, music publishing, an adjacent Latin/Spanish language record label (Maverick Música), and a television production company.

The first releases for the company were Madonna's 1992 coffee table publication Sex, and its accompanying studio album, Erotica (released simultaneously); the book, notably, drew harsh criticism towards Madonna herself, despite the book's intention to be read as an erotic and irreverent "poetry journal" with artistic, vintage-style black-and-white photos, and a telling of fictional romantic escapades.

The journalist and biographer J. Randy Taraborrelli considered the existence of Maverick Records to be an "anomaly", as Madonna became one of the first female artists to head a real record label, and one of the few women to run her own entertainment company.

DeMann was bought out of the company for a reported $20 million in 1998. Guy Oseary increased his stake in the company and took control as chairman and CEO, thus Madonna was no longer the head of Maverick. Madonna and Dashev left in 2004 after a lawsuit between Maverick and Warner Music Group, in which Maverick had accused parent label Warner of not providing sufficient operating funds to compete against other, bigger labels for music acts. Since 2009, the label has been defunct; some of its acts were transferred to Warner Bros. Records or Reprise Records directly. In 2014, the brand was revived as a management group, founded by Oseary, in-partnership with Live Nation Entertainment.

== History ==
=== Beginnings ===
Maverick Records launched in April 1992 as a unit of the Maverick entertainment company. It was a joint venture between Madonna, Frederick DeMann, Veronica "Ronnie" Dashev, and Time Warner, and its name was combined from the names of three of the founders; Madonna, Veronica and Frederick. The company had divisions for recording, music publishing, television, film, merchandising and book publishing. The venture was part of a $60 million recording and business deal between Madonna and Time Warner. It gave her 20% royalties from the music proceedings, one of the highest rates in the industry, equalled at that time only by Michael Jackson's royalty rate established a year earlier with Sony.

At the time of its launch, the company was bi-coastal, with offices in New York City and Los Angeles. The record company division of Maverick also consisted of sub-label Maverick Musica (a Miami, Florida-based satellite label focusing on Latin-American music) and Maverick Music Publishing. The first releases for the company were Madonna's 1992 coffee table publication, Sex, and her studio album Erotica, which were released simultaneously to great controversy.

=== Commercial success ===
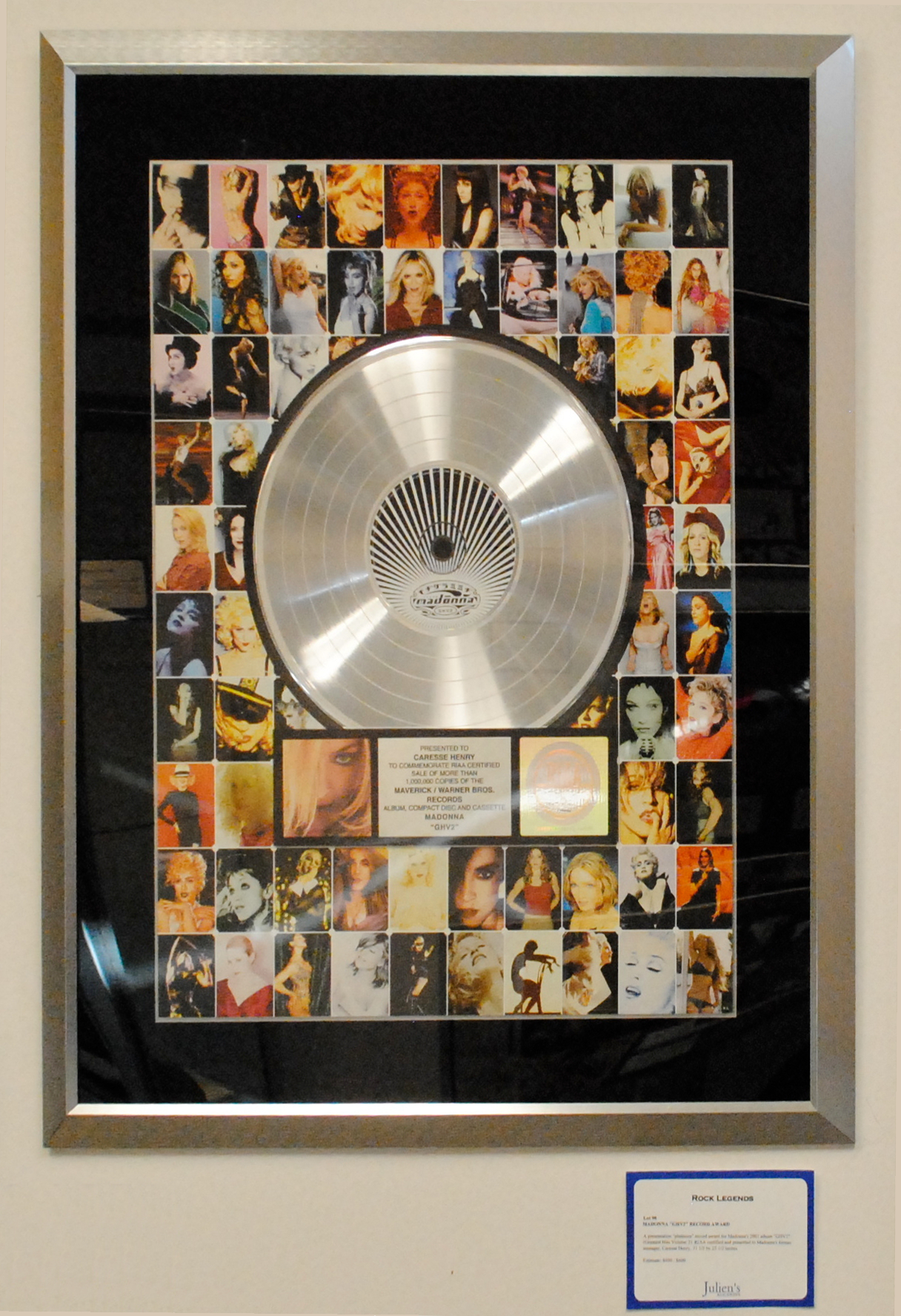
Platinum record for Madonna's 2001 greatest hits album, GHV2, released by Maverick Records

Maverick's first commercial success was with the self-titled debut album by Seattle-based grunge band Candlebox. Released in 1993, the album would be RIAA-certified quadruple platinum in the United States. The following year, the label signed Canadian musician Alanis Morissette, whose third album (and Maverick debut) Jagged Little Pill was released in 1995, and would be eventually certified 16× platinum in the U.S. (overall global sales of 33 million units)–making it the best-selling album in the label's history, and of the 1990s.

DeMann was bought out of the company for a reported $20 million in March 1999, after which Guy Oseary increased his stake in the company and took control as chairman and CEO.

Throughout the 1990s and into the mid-2000s, Maverick would also release albums by Erasure, Michelle Branch, Meshell Ndegeocello, U.N.V., Dana Dane, N-Phase, Dalvin DeGrate, the Prodigy, Cleopatra, Tyler Hilton, Muse, Deftones, Summercamp, No Authority and William Orbit. In 1999 Maverick released The Matrix: Music from the Motion Picture from the Wachowskis film The Matrix (1999) and Marilyn Manson's single "Rock is Dead" from aforementioned soundtrack and their third studio album Mechanical Animals (1998). "I'm happy with Maverick as a label," observed the Prodigy's Liam Howlett. "They respect their bands; even the ones who aren't selling."

=== Decline and final years ===
By the early 2000s, Maverick saw its commercial fortunes decline and business operations financially unravel. In March 2004, the label and Madonna filed suit against Warner Music Group (and its former parent company, Time Warner), claiming that mismanagement of resources and poor bookkeeping had cost the company millions of dollars. Warner filed a countersuit, alleging that Maverick had lost tens of millions of dollars on its own.

On June 14, 2004, the dispute was resolved when Maverick shares owned by Madonna and Dashev were purchased — which effectively exiled the two of them from the company, as it then became a wholly owned subsidiary of Warner Music Group. Then Maverick CEO Guy Oseary, meanwhile, retained his position until WMG purchased his label shares in 2006. The same year, the band Lillix, which at the time was signed to the label, claimed that the Maverick label no longer existed and that all the artists were now handled by Warner Bros. directly. In 2009, the record company folded.

Two of the label's most successful artists, Alanis Morissette and Michelle Branch, left in the late 2000s. Branch left in 2007 after disbanding The Wreckers, while Morissette left after the release of 2008 album Flavors of Entanglement. Madonna's recording contract remained with Warner Bros. Records under a separate agreement until 2009.

In 2001, Maverick Picture Company was rebranded as simply Maverick Films and was solely managed by Madonna and Guy Oseary, CEO of another Maverick division, Maverick Records. In 2004, Madonna and Dashev were bought out of Maverick after a lawsuit with Warner Music Group and they no longer have an interest in the company. In August 2008, company head Mark Morgan and Oseary split with Oseary retaining the rights to the Maverick name his artist management business while Morgan retain ownership of the company's projects and changing the name to Imprint Entertainment. Oseary later formed a joint venture with Live Nation Entertainment in 2014 to revive Maverick as a management group.

In 2010, Maverick Records sued the teenage file-sharer Whitney Harper for copyright infringement, and won the case. Harper was ordered to pay $750 per song for the three dozen songs downloaded from the Internet. The case was appealed to the Supreme Court of the United States, which declined review of the case following an opinion by Justice Samuel Alito. The case is known as Harper v. Maverick Recording Co..

== Selected recording artists ==
- Aaron Bruno (2002)
- Alanis Morissette (1994–2009)
- Bad Brains (1994–1995)
- Baxter (1998)
- Candlebox (1992–2000)
- Cleopatra (1998–2001)
- Dana Dane (1994–1995)
- Deftones (1995–2006)
- Erasure (1997)
- Family Force 5 (2006)
- Goldfinger (2005)
- Jack's Mannequin (2005–2008)
- John Stevens (2004–2006)
- Jude (1998–2001)
- Lillix (2002–2007)
- Madonna (1992–2004)
- Meshell Ndegeocello (1992–2003)
- Mest (1995–2006)
- Michelle Branch (2001–2003)
- Muse (1999–2004)
- Neurotic Outsiders (1996–1997)
- No Authority
- Onesidezero (2000–2002)
- Paul Oakenfold (2002–2006)
- Showoff
- Solar Twins (1999–2000)
- Story of the Year (2002–2007)
- Tantric (2000–2004)
- The Prodigy (UK)
- The Shore (2004)
- The Wreckers (2006–2007)
- Tyler Hilton (2001–2005)
- Ünloco (2001–2003)
- U.N.V. (1993–1995)
- William Orbit (1999–2000)

== Divisions ==
- Maverick Records – record label
- Maverick Musica – Latin division of Maverick Records
- Maverick Books – book publishing
- Maverick Films - production company, now Imprint Entertainment
- MadGuy Television – television production, now Imprint Television
- MadGuy Films – film and television production
- Maverick Music – publishing division

== See also ==
- 2010 term United States Supreme Court opinions of Samuel Alito
- BMG Music v. Gonzalez
- Madonna and business
