= Frank Easterbrook =

American judge and legal scholar (born 1948)

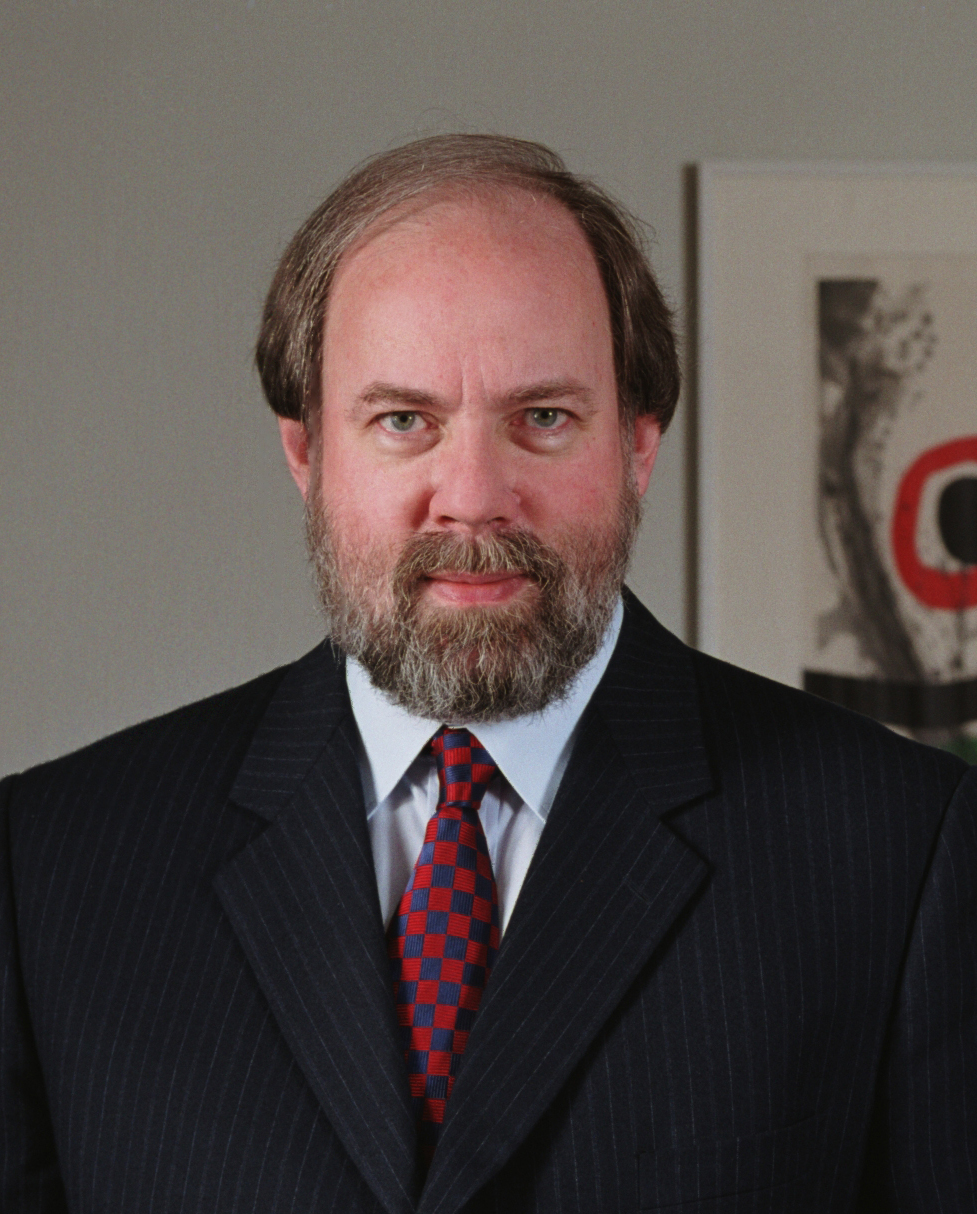

Chief Judge of the United States Court of Appeals for the Seventh Circuit
- In office November 27, 2006 – October 1, 2013
- Preceded by: Joel Flaum
- Succeeded by: Diane Wood

Judge of the United States Court of Appeals for the Seventh Circuit
- Incumbent
- Assumed office April 4, 1985
- Appointed by: Ronald Reagan
- Preceded by: Seat established

Personal details
- Born: Frank Hoover Easterbrook; September 3, 1948 (age 78) Buffalo, New York, U.S.
- Relatives: Gregg Easterbrook (brother)
- Education: Swarthmore College (BA); University of Chicago (JD)

Frank Hoover Easterbrook (born September 3, 1948) is an American lawyer and jurist who is a United States circuit judge of the United States Court of Appeals for the Seventh Circuit. He was appointed in 1985 by President Ronald Reagan, and he was the chief judge of the court from 2006 to 2013.

== Early life and education ==
Easterbrook was born in Buffalo, New York, on September 3, 1948, the son of Vimy and George Easterbrook. His younger brothers are author Gregg Easterbrook and Neil Easterbrook, a professor at Texas Christian University. He attended Kenmore West High School in Tonawanda, New York.

After high school, Easterbrook attended Swarthmore College, where he was elected to Phi Beta Kappa and received his Bachelor of Arts degree with high honors in 1970. He then attended the University of Chicago Law School, where he was an editor of the University of Chicago Law Review along with future judge Douglas H. Ginsburg. He graduated in 1973 with a J.D. and membership in the Order of the Coif.

== Early career ==
After law school, Easterbrook clerked for judge Levin Hicks Campbell of the U.S. Court of Appeals for the First Circuit from 1973 to 1974. He then joined the U.S. Solicitor General's office as an Assistant to the Solicitor General, and was promoted in 1978 to Deputy Solicitor General. The solicitor general at the time was Robert Bork, and Easterbrook has reminisced that when he joined the Solicitor General's office, "The Washington Post noted that around the same time the SG's Office had hired three lawyers either fresh from clerkships or lacking the customary appellate experience. None of us had clerked on the Supreme Court. The Post concluded that good lawyers were no longer willing to work for the Solicitor General and attributed this to Bork's role in firing Archibald Cox as Watergate special prosecutor. The paper thought that dark days lay ahead for the Office with a second-rate staff. The three bottom-of-the-barrel selections were Robert Reich (later Secretary of Labor in the Clinton Administration), Danny Boggs (future Chief Judge of the Sixth Circuit), and me." Easterbrook was considered "one of the very top advocates appearing before the Supreme Court in his days at the bar".

Easterbrook joined the faculty of the University of Chicago Law School in 1978. He was a principal at the economics consulting firm Compass Lexecon from 1980 until his judicial appointment. Easterbrook argued 20 cases before the Supreme Court while in the Solicitor General's office and in private practice, including several landmark antitrust cases.

== Federal judicial service ==
Easterbrook was nominated to the court by President Ronald Reagan on August 1, 1984, to a new seat created by 98 Stat. 333, 346; the United States Senate did not act on his nomination that year, and he was renominated in Reagan's second term on February 25, 1985.

Easterbrook was confirmed by the Senate on April 3, 1985, and received his commission the next day. The American Bar Association gave Easterbrook a low "qualified/not qualified" rating, presumably due to his youth and relative inexperience. In 2001 this rating was claimed by the George W. Bush administration as evidence of liberal bias in the ABA in its announcement that it would no longer confer with the ABA in selecting judicial nominees.

Among Judge Easterbrook's most prominent opinions are:

- American Booksellers v. Hudnut (1986)
- Kirchoff v. Flynn (1986)
- In re Erickson (1987)
- In re Sinclair (1989)
- United States v. Van Fossan (1990)
- Miller v. South Bend (1990)
- United States v. Marshall (1990)
- Gacy v. Welborn (1993)
- ProCD v. Zeidenberg (1996)
- Asher v. Baxter International Inc. (2004)
- BMG Music v. Gonzalez (2005)
- Hosty v. Carter (2005)
- Doe v. Smith 429 F.3d 706 (7th Cir. 2005)

As a young judge in one of his early opinions, Kirchoff v. Flynn, 786 F.2d 320 (CA7 1986), a lawsuit over an arrest for feeding pigeons in a park, Easterbrook used such language as "trundled to the squadrol" to describe an arrest; and states of the pigeon-feeder that she "will never be confused with the 30th Earl of Mar, whose hobby was kicking pigeons". He described a controversy over whether a police officer, or the plaintiff's own bird, had attacked the plaintiff as: "[Plaintiff] says that he was clobbered by a pair of handcuffs; [the officer] maintains that the [plaintiffs]' red macaw drew the blood when it landed on [plaintiff]'s head during the fracas and started pecking". In a footnote, he added "Predatory birds rarely attack large animals whose eyes they can see, 11 Harv.Med. School Health Letter 8 (Feb.1986), and perhaps William's eyes got distracted, to his macaw's glee." This may be seen either as an example of Easterbrook's deftness with language, or his penchant for engaging in self-indulgent pedantry. Either way, his opinions often exhibit nearly impenetrable language, such as in Frantz v. U.S. Powerlifting Federation, 836 F.2d 1063 (7th Cir. 1987), where he wrote, "The absence of ineluctable answers does not imply the privilege to indulge an unexamined gestalt."

University of Chicago Law School Dean Saul Levmore stated that "Easterbrook is an important influence on legal education through his judicial opinions. Course after law school course has changed for the better as Judge Easterbrook's opinions have made their way into the curriculum. So long as he decides cases, and decides them in a way that cuts to the heart of an issue with such skill and pressure, no area of law can be dull".

Easterbrook had a reputation for being "hard-nosed and demanding" during oral argument. In Schlessinger v. Salimes (1996), for example, he characterized the lawsuit as "goofy" and the appellant's arguments as "nutty" before issuing an order to show cause why the appellant and lawyer should not be sanctioned for a frivolous appeal. His demeanor has won him enemies in the bar. In 1994 the Chicago Council of Lawyers published an "evaluation" of the Seventh Circuit that evaluated all the judges and the court's procedures in general, but notably focused extensively on only two: Easterbrook and then-chief judge Richard Posner. The evaluation of Easterbrook contained an unusual number of grievances; and the Council did not specify authorship, so the criticism is anonymous. In a section devoted to Easterbrook's judicial demeanor, the report claims he "has consistently displayed a temperament that is improper for a Circuit Judge. While Judge Easterbrook has many good qualities, there is a widespread belief that he is arrogant and intolerant with those who do not match his own intellectual level. This problem seriously interferes with the performance of his duties". The report continued to state Easterbrook "has been resoundingly and repeatedly criticized as being extremely rude to attorneys at oral argument" and that "some attorneys" said that due to the judge's demeanor they and their clients did not feel they got a fair hearing. The Council pointed to another opinion, Kale v. Obuchowski, which derided a lawyer's argument as "pettifoggery" and concluded that the appeal was "frivolous, doomed and sanctionable". The Council argued that even if the lawyer's conduct was sanctionable, "the language chosen does not enhance the administration of justice".

However, this review by the council was never repeated, lending partial support to the defenders of Easterbrook and Posner that the report was an opportunity for anonymous venting by lawyers who were unhappy with the results of Seventh Circuit decisions, in no small part thanks to the decisions of Reagan appointees Easterbrook and Posner. In 2020 Posner commented about the report, "You have here some anonymous people who are talking to the Chicago Council of Lawyers. How much credence should we put on these people? They can be sore losers. They can be crybabies."

Easterbrook served as Chief Judge of the Seventh Circuit from 2006 to 2013. He is a member of the Judicial Conference of the United States and head of the Judicial Council for the Seventh Circuit.

== Influences ==
Easterbrook called Learned Hand and Oliver Wendell Holmes Jr. his "judicial heroes".

== Notable cases ==
=== Second Amendment cases ===
In June 2009, Easterbrook wrote the decision in NRA v. City of Chicago, holding that the Second Amendment, which protects the right to keep and bear arms, did not bind state governments. This allowed the City of Chicago to maintain its ban on purchasing and possessing handguns. This decision was later overturned by the Supreme Court in McDonald v. City of Chicago.

In April 2015, Easterbrook wrote the decision in Friedman v. City of Highland Park holding that a city ordinance that generally prohibited the possession, sale or manufacture of semi-automatic assault weapons and large capacity magazines did not violate the Second Amendment.

In May 2023, Easterbrook put a hold on an injunction that had been issued against an Illinois assault weapon and magazine ban by a federal judge in southern Illinois. This allowed the ban on firearms and magazines to take effect across the state.

=== Other cases ===
In December 2017, Easterbrook supported the 4–3 en banc decision to reverse an earlier federal magistrate judgment that a confession had been unlawfully coerced from 16-year-old Brendan Dassey.

On November 1, 2019, Easterbrook concurred in the denial of rehearing regarding an Indiana abortion law requiring parental notifications. A 3-judge panel had struck down the injunctions. Easterbrook, and Diane S. Sykes who joined him, were the deciding votes to deny en banc. Easterbrook in his concurrence called on the Supreme Court to hear the case, and also pointed out its parallels with June Medical Services v. Gee.

On January 23, 2020, Easterbrook wrote a decision slamming the Justice Department for arguing that a previous decision by the Seventh Circuit in the same immigration case was wrongly decided and that the Board of Immigration Appeals could ignore the decision. Easterbrook wrote, "The Board [of Immigration Appeals] seemed to think that we had issued an advisory opinion, and that faced with a conflict between our views and those of the Attorney General it should follow the latter. Yet it should not be necessary to remind the Board, all of whose members are lawyers, that the 'judicial Power' under Article III of the Constitution is one to make conclusive decisions, not subject to disapproval or revision by another branch of government." The Court reversed the Board's decision and entered a judgment in favor of the plaintiff. Jorge Baez-Sanchez v. Barr.

On June 29, 2020, Easterbrook wrote the opinion to reinstate significant voting restrictions in Wisconsin, originally put into place when Republicans controlled all branches of state government early in the previous decade and which U.S. District Judge James Peterson had overturned on constitutional grounds in July 2016. Easterbrook wrote that even though the voting restrictions are discriminatory, it was purely based upon party affiliation (the areas most impacted are heavily Democratic leaning). His conclusion that this is acceptable relies on a 2019 US Supreme Court ruling that partisan manipulation of electoral districts was also acceptable. "The changes were made because of politics," he wrote. "This record does not support a conclusion that the legislators who voted for the contested statutes cared about race; they cared about voters' political preferences." He added that Democratic lawmakers could retake control of the legislature and change the laws they objected to. Barry Burden, director of the Elections Research Center at the University of Wisconsin-Madison, observed "This is an amazing conclusion that opens the doors to all kinds of partisan manipulation of election practices. It completely ignores the possibility that the party in charge might be able to alter the rules to keep itself in power, thus removing the ability of the opposing party to change the laws in the other direction." The case was argued in 2017 and it was long a mystery why the court hadn't issued its ruling long before. Easterbrook's written opinion offered no explanation for the delay in delivering it until preparations for the 2020 national election cycle were just beginning, during the COVID-19 pandemic and in the most closely contested "battleground state" of the 2016 national election cycle.

On August 2, 2021, Easterbrook wrote the unanimous majority opinion upholding Indiana University's requirement for students to get the COVID-19 vaccine. Ten days later, circuit justice Amy Coney Barrett left the decision in place, denying a motion to block the policy temporarily while the challengers sought review from the Supreme Court. A few months later in a similar case, the full Supreme Court likewise declined a request to block vaccine requirements for health care workers in Maine.

== Academic work ==
Easterbrook's academic work focuses on corporate law, particularly the 1996 book The Economic Structure of Corporate Law, which he coauthored with Daniel Fischel. Easterbrook's article, "The Proper Role of a Target's Management in Responding to a Tender Offer", 94 Harv. L. Rev. 1161 (1981) (also coauthored with Fischel) is the most heavily cited corporate law article in legal scholarship. Easterbrook has also written articles on antitrust law and judicial interpretation, including The Limits of Antitrust, 63 Tex. L. Rev. 1 (1984); Abstraction and Authority, 59 U. Chi. L. Rev. 349 (1992); Statutes' Domains, 50 U. Chi. L. Rev. 533 (1983); and Textualism and the Dead Hand, 66 Geo. Wash. L. Rev. 1119 (1998). Easterbrook also expressed his opinions about how US states compete with each other in the race to the bottom to win corporations, in " The Race for the Bottom in Corporate Governance", 95 Va. L. Rev. 685 (2009).

== Selected scholarly works ==
=== Books ===
- Easterbrook, Frank; Fischel, Daniel (1996). The Economic Structure of Corporate Law. Harvard University Press. ISBN 9780674235397.

=== Articles ===
- Easterbrook, Frank; Fischel, Daniel (1981). "The Proper Role of a Target's Management in Responding to a Tender Offer". Harvard Law Review. 94 (6): 1161–1204. JSTOR 1340753.
- —; Fischel, Daniel (1982). "Corporate Control Transactions". Yale Law Journal. 91 (4): 698–738. JSTOR 796036.
- — (1983). "Statutes' Domains". University of Chicago Law Review. 50: 533–52. JSTOR 1599501.
- —; Fischel, Daniel (1983). "Voting in Corporate Law". Journal of Law and Economics. 26 (2): 395–428.
- —; Fischel, Daniel (1984). "Mandatory Disclosure and the Protection of Investors". Virginia Law Review. 70 (4): 669–716. JSTOR 1073082.
- — (1984). "The Limits of Antitrust". Texas Law Review. 63 (1): 1–40.
- — (1984). "The Supreme Court, 1983 Term — Foreword: The Court and the Economic System". Harvard Law Review. 98 (1): 4–60. JSTOR 1341016.
- —; Fischel, Daniel (1985). "Limited Liability and the Corporation". University of Chicago Law Review. 52 (1): 89–117. JSTOR 1599572.
- —; Fischel, Daniel (1989). "The Corporate Contract". Columbia Law Review. 89 (7): 1416–48. JSTOR 1122807.
- — (1992). "Abstraction and Authority". University of Chicago Law Review. 59 (1): 349–80. JSTOR 1599940.
- — (1993). "Text, History, and Structure in Statutory Interpretation". Harvard Journal of Law & Public Policy. 17: 61–70.
- — (1996). "Cyberspace and the Law of the Horse". University of Chicago Legal Forum. 1996: 207–16.

== See also ==
- George W. Bush Supreme Court candidates
- List of United States federal judges by longevity of service

Legal offices
New seat	Judge of the United States Court of Appeals for the Seventh Circuit; 1985–present	Incumbent
Preceded by Joel Flaum	Chief Judge of the United States Court of Appeals for the Seventh Circuit; 2006–2013	Succeeded by Diane Wood
