= The University of Chicago Legal Forum =

- Discipline: Law
- Language: English

Publication details
- History: 1985–present
- Publisher: University of Chicago Law School (United States)

Standard abbreviations
- Bluebook: U. Chi. Legal F.
- ISO 4: Univ. Chic. Leg. Forum

Indexing
- ISSN: 0892-5593
- LCCN: 88646252
- OCLC no.: 818992631

Links
- Journal homepage; Online archive; HeinOnline

The University of Chicago Legal Forum is a student-edited journal published by the University of Chicago Law School. It focuses on a single, highly relevant, legal issue every year, presenting an authoritative and timely approach to a particular topic. To facilitate discussion, the Legal Forum hosts a symposium each fall and the participants contribute articles for the volume.

== History ==
The University of Chicago Legal Forum was first published in 1985, making it the University of Chicago Law School’s second-oldest journal. The Legal Forum is a student-edited journal that hones in on a single cutting-edge legal topic every year.

Each fall, the Legal Forum hosts a symposium, with the participants then contributing articles for the volume that will ultimately be published. For November 2015, the Symposium is entitled "Policing the Police" and will subsequently be published as Volume 2016. Additional topics in others years have included "Does Election Law Serve the Electorate?", "The Civil Rights Act at 50 Years", "Frontiers of Consumer Protection", "Combating Corruption", "Governance and Power", "Crime Criminal Law and the Recession", "Law in a Networked World", "Immigration Law and Policy, Law and Life: Definitions and Decisionmaking", and "Cutting-Edge Issues in Class Action Litigation."

Since its founding and each year thereafter, members of academia, the judiciary, and the bar have participated in the Legal Forum symposia. Past participants and published authors have included Supreme Court Justice Ruth Bader Ginsburg, Judge Richard Posner, Judge Frank Easterbrook, Judge Diane Wood, Judge Abner Mikva, Judge Patricia Wald, Judge Danny Boggs, Dean Lee Bollinger, Professor Randall Kennedy, Professor Cass Sunstein, Professor Lani Guinier, Professor Richard Epstein, Professor Kimberlé Crenshaw, and Professor Akhil Reed Amar.

Legal Forum articles have also been cited in numerous judicial opinions. In addition, the Legal Forum has been mentioned in publications such as the New York Times and Irish Examiner. The Legal Forum and its authors have also been featured on the University of Chicago's main website.

== Past Issues ==
Past issues can be found online through HeinOnline, a well-regarded academic database.

- Volume 2020 - What's the Harm? The Future of the First Amendment
- Volume 2019 - Law in the Era of #MeToo
- Volume 2018 - Law and Urban Institutions Ten Years after The Wire
- Volume 2017 - Law and the Disruptive Workplace
- Volume 2016 - Policing the Police
- Volume 2015 - Does Election Law Serve the Electorate?
- Volume 2014 - The Civil Rights Act at 50 Years
- Volume 2013 - Frontiers of Consumer Protection
- Volume 2012 - Combating Corruption
- Volume 2011 - Governance and Power
- Volume 2010 - Crime, Criminal Law, and the Recession
- Volume 2009 - Civil Rights Law and the Low-Wage Worker
- Volume 2008 - Law in a Networked World
- Volume 2007 - Immigration Law and Policy
- Volume 2006 - Law and Life: Definitions and Decisionmaking
- Volume 2005 - Punishment and Crime
- Volume 2004 - The Public and Private Faces of Family Law
- Volume 2003 - Current Issues in Class Action Litigation
- Volume 2002 - The Scope of Equal Protection
- Volume 2001 - Frontiers of Jurisdiction
- Volume 2000 - Antitrust in the Information Age
- Volume 1999 - The Law of Sex Discrimination
- Volume 1998 - The Right to a Fair Trial
- Volume 1997 - Rethinking Environmental Protection for the 21st Century
- Volume 1996 - The Law of Cyberspace
- Volume 1995 - Voting Rights and Elections
- Volume 1994 - Toward a Rational Drug Policy
- Volume 1993 - A Free and Responsible Press
- Volume 1992 - Europe and America in 1992 and Beyond: Common Problems...Common Solutions?
- Volume 1991 - At the Schoolhouse Gate: Education, Law and Democracy
- Volume 1990 - The Role of the Jury in Civil Dispute Resolutions
- Volume 1989 - Feminism in the Law: Theory, Practice and Criticism
- Volume 1988 - Testing in the Workplace
- Volume 1987 - Consent Decrees: Practical Problems and Legal Dilemmas
- Volume 1986 - Barriers to International Trade in Professional Services
