= Operation 404 =

Brazilian operation against online piracy

Operation 404 is a Brazilian anti-piracy initiative launched in 2019 by the Ministry of Justice and Public Security with the support of several enforcement agencies at both national and international levels.

The operation was named after HTTP 404, which indicates the web page cannot be found, symbolizes the objective of making illegal content unavailable on the internet. The operation involved the blocking and seizure of piracy websites, IPTV services, applications, and social media accounts. The operation also involved the arrests of 11 people in Brazil and 32 search and seizure warrants were issued for computers and equipment.

According to the state-owned news agency Agência Brasil, 606 website blocks are complied with, of which 238 are hosted in Brazil, 328 in Peru, and 40 in the United Kingdom. About 100 of the website in broadcasting the English soccer league Premier League. 19 streaming applications were also taken offline.
