= Flava Works Inc. v. Gunter =

2012 US decision on copyright infringement

Flava Works, Inc. v. Gunter
- Court: United States Court of Appeals for the Seventh Circuit
- Full case name: Flava Works, Inc. v. Marques Rondale Gunter, doing business as myVidster.com; and Salsalndy, LLC
- Argued: May 25, 2012
- Decided: August 2, 2012
- Citations: 689 F.3d 754; 103 U.S.P.Q.2d 1563

Case history
- Prior history: Injunction granted, No. 1:10-cv-06517, 101 U.S.P.Q.2d 1816 (N.D. Ill. 2011)

Court membership
- Judges sitting: Richard Posner, Joel Martin Flaum, Diane Pamela Wood

Case opinions
- Majority: Posner, joined by unanimous

Flava Works, Inc v. Gunter, 689 F.3d 754 (7th Cir. 2012), is a decision by the United States Seventh Circuit Court of Appeals, authored by Judge Richard Posner, which held that Marques Gunter, the sole proprietor of the site myVidster.com, a social bookmarking website that enables its users to share videos posted elsewhere online through embedded frames, was not liable for its users' sharing and embedding of copyrighted videos. The court of appeals reversed the decision of the United States District Court for the Northern District of Illinois, which had granted a preliminary injunction against myVidster, citing sufficient knowledge of infringement on Gunter's part, while denying safe harbor defense under the Digital Millennium Copyright Act (DMCA). The Court held that Gunter was not directly liable because the copyrighted content was not stored on myVidster's servers, and was not contributorily liable because there was no evidence that conduct by myVidster increased the amount of infringement.

== Background ==
Flava Works is an adult entertainment company producing pornographic videos and images featuring black and Latino men. It owns several registered copyrights and trademarks. Part of Flava Works' business includes streaming video through its various websites. In 2010 Flava Works filed a complaint against myVidster, a website allowing users to post videos to be searched and viewed by other users. The complaint contained seven counts of infringement:

1. direct copyright infringement (Count I)
2. contributory copyright infringement (Count II)
3. vicarious copyright infringement (Count III)
4. inducement of copyright infringement (Count IV)
5. false designation of origin in violation of the Lanham Act (Count V)
6. trademark and trade dress infringement in violation of the Lanham Act (Count VI) and
7. common law trademark infringement and unfair competition (Count VII)

Flava Works alleged that by not policing his site properly, MyVidster's sole proprietor Marques Gunter "purposefully created a system that makes it more difficult for copyright owners to monitor the site for infringement." In late 2010 Flava Works sent Gunter and his web hosting companies a number of takedown notices under the DMCA, these notices included the user names of repeat posters of infringing content. Flava Works did not contest that Gunter removed offending content from this site, but complained that Gunter did nothing to stop repeat offenders, allowing infringing work to continually appear on his website.

== Court case ==
In district court's response to Gunter's motion for dismissal on May 10, 2011, the court dismissed 6 of the 7 counts of copyright and trademark violations claimed by Flava Works, leaving only the count of contributory copyright infringement. Judge John F. Grady: "The plaintiff alleges… after having received the notices of defendants failed to act to prevent future similar infringing conduct…", further "it [plaintiff] also alleges that MyVidster has no filters or identifiers in place to prevent infringers and that it took no action to stop or ban of the repeat infringers who allegedly posted plaintiff's copyrighted works. These allegations are more than sufficient to allege material contribution."

The court granted a preliminary injunction on July 27, 2011 against MyVidster citing sufficient knowledge of infringement on Gunter's part to support contributory infringement claims, while denying DMCA safe harbor defense based on Gunter's failure to take meaningful action against repeat infringers. The court satisfied the requirement for material contribution to infringing activity through the basic nature of the MyVidster site: "Gunter provides the MyVidster site, which enables the display of embedded videos and thus the infringement. Gunter also makes video storage (which involves making a copy of the video) available for free." The court further supported its contributory infringement holding by citing Gunter's inevitable knowledge of the infringement that was occurring on his website: "We also have no doubt that defendants knew or should have known of the infringement occurring on MyVidster."

Gunter claimed safe harbor for defense under the DMCA, specifically the safe harbor offered by the Online Copyright Infringement Liability Limitation Act applying to online service providers with "information residing on systems or networks at [the] direction of users", 17 U.S.C. § 512(c). To qualify for this defense, one must show that they have "…adopted and reasonably implemented, and informs subscribers and account holders of the service provider's system or network of, a policy that provides for the termination in appropriate circumstances of subscribers and account holders of the service provider's system or network who are repeat infringers…", according to 17 U.S.C. § 512(i).

The court drew specific issue with Gunter's repeat violator policy of removing content that originally existed behind a pay wall, and sending the violator an e-mail warning. The court took issue both with the incompleteness of this policy and the fact that it did not address copyright law: "Gunter's 'repeat infringer' policy is in fact no policy at all, at least with respect to copyright infringement." The court commented that Gunter's "perspective is the epitome of 'willful blindness'", further "his definition of 'repeat infringer' does not encompass copyright law."

On September 1, 2011, the court denied Gunter's motion for reconsideration of their July 27, 2011 injunction. Gunter claimed that the holding of the Court was in direct contradiction to the United States Court of Appeals for the Ninth Circuit decision in Perfect 10, Inc. v. Amazon.com, Inc., and that myVidster users had committed no direct infringement, and therefore Gunter could not be responsible for contributory infringement. The majority of myVidster users did not actually save copies of infringing material, but rather used in-line linking to post videos. While the Perfect 10, Inc. v. Amazon.com, Inc. did involve the in-line linking of content, the court declined to apply this precedent to the case, citing that:

1. The 9th circuit decision was nonbinding to the court and
2. The case was "highly fact-specific and distinguishable"

The court drew distinction between the conduct of Google and myVidster users, portraying Google's activity as a neutral search algorithm while myVidster users "handout-pick" content.

The case was appealed to the Seventh Circuit Court of Appeals - argument was heard on May 25, 2012; a decision was rendered on August 2, 2012, vacating the district court's grant of a preliminary injunction. The case gained notoriety after Google, Facebook, and the Motion Picture Association of America (MPAA) filed amici briefs with the Court of Appeals.

=== Ruling ===
The Court, presided by Judge Posner, held that Flava Works failed to establish substantial likelihood of success on the merits of its contributory infringement claim. Grounds of the ruling included -

- The "infringers" were people uploading material in breach of copyright. There was no evidence these were myVidster users, nor evidence of a link between such people and myVidster, nor that myVidster "contributed" or incentivized this behavior.
- The myVidster user viewing such material online is not engaging in copyright infringement, any more than a person "sneaking into a movie theater to watch a movie without buying a ticket" is infringing copyright by seeing the movie: - "That is a bad thing to do (in either case) but it is not copyright infringement".
- The "typical" definition of a "contributory" infringer is unhelpful, insofar as it allows that a person "may" be held liable (and presumptively therefore may not in some cases be held liable), does not define "materially" and does not distinguish "cause" from "contribute". The definition of Bender v West Publishing and Perfect 10 v. Amazon is preferable for legal certainty: "personal conduct that encourages or assists the infringement". However there is no evidence that conduct by myVidster increases the amount of infringement (for example by myVidster users further copying those videos they view by means of myVidster).
- Alleged financial loss of Flava (if proven) is not evidence of contributory infringement by myVidster.
- Similarly, non-compliance with Digital Millennium Copyright Act (DMCA) safe harbor and takedown processes is not evidence of wrongdoing: - "a noninfringer doesn't need safe harbor".
- There are practical and social objections to "stretching the concept of contributory infringement far enough to make a social bookmarking service a policeman of copyright law".
- Legislative mention of "referring or linking users to an online location containing infringing material" (DMCA) is not by itself evidence of infringement; overwhelmingly the vast majority of hyperlinks on the internet will by design navigate to (and if followed by a user will display) content which is copyright and therefore capable of being infringed by a user (and constitutes infringement or infringing material if inappropriately accessed), (Note: Infringing material may include not just videos, but potentially quotations, images visible in the web page, images such as trademarks, book covers, art, product images, and movie characters visible in images, copyrighted fonts (case), music in home movies (case), and any other copyright material. In January 2012 anti-infringement Senator Patrick Leahy's website was reported in Time magazine and other sources to have been an online location containing infringing material; the site was identified as using an unauthorised copyright image as a background image.) including web page background images, background images or sounds, or other third party creations. The more plausible interpretation of the clause is a desire to make safe harbor as wide as possible, and not to make the scope of infringement as wide as possible.
- Knowing that some of the many links on its site are infringing, does not cause myVidster to be a contributory infringer; any infringement is unencouraged and the link, or any social benefit as a theory of liability is very tenuous.
- Flava was only able to locate 300 bookmarks (of 1.2 million on the site) which it claimed linked to its material. Of these it is unknown what viewing took place, and myVidster was certainly not the sole route of awareness of the links. Flava claimed a large amount of lost revenue but there is no evidence of the time this took place, or its cause (including means of "lost sales"), and there is no clear evidence of myVidster having been responsible for any specific amount of this, short of complete speculation: - "myVidster may have very little - even nothing - to do with Flavas financial troubles". Further, Flava "[had not shown] that myVidster's service really does contribute significantly to infringement of Flava's copyright".
- A joint brief by Google and Facebook analyzed myVidster as being at best a tertiary infringer, if even that, a position not recognized as liable in any current theory of law - indeed the law does not recognize "secondary" infringement either. It recognizes three positions: direct infringement, contributory infringement, and non-infringement.
- myVidster was also not responsible for any performance "publicly". While arguably at infringement "performance by uploading" took place, this was not related to myVidster. On watching, myVidster users received the media directly via a third party (myVidster "did not touch the data stream") and the "performance" was neither "public" nor "performed" by myVidster. (By analogy, when a newspaper states a play is on, and provides directions to where it may be seen, it is not thereby "performing" them or causing them to be "performed") To decide otherwise would "blur the distinction between direct and contributory infringement" to an inappropriate level.
- Unlike "swap meets" where commercial benefit was expected to flow, myVidster did not seek to achieve commercial benefit by promoting infringing activity. (A previous and closed "premium" service whereby myVidster offered backup services for users had done so but was no longer active)
