= Telstra Corporation Ltd. v Commonwealth =

2008 High Court of Australia case

Telstra Corporation Limited v The Commonwealth
- Court: High Court of Australia
- Decided: 6 March 2008
- Citations: [2008] HCA 7, (2008) 234 CLR 210

Court membership
- Judges sitting: Gleeson CJ, Gummow, Kirby, Hayne, Heydon, Crennan and Kiefel JJ

Telstra Corporation Limited v The Commonwealth was an important case decided in the High Court of Australia on 6 March 2008.

It concerned a dispute between Telstra Corporation and the Commonwealth of Australia, the Australian Competition & Consumer Commission (ACCC) and eleven other ISPs regarding the ownership of and shared access obligations to the Telstra controlled unconditional local loop (ULL) copper telecommunications network. The case determined that although Telstra owned and maintained this network, its ownership over these assets were always subject to a statutory access regime permitting other carriers access to these assets. It is an important case in Australia constitutional law in that it explored the interpretation of the nature of property and acquisition. The ruling had a resounding effect on competition and consumer protection within the Australian telecommunications industry by upholding the right to fair competition of competing carriers, thus preventing a monopoly control of Internet and telephony services by Telstra.

== Background to the case ==
From the 1880s Australia had developed an extensive public switched telephone network (PSTN) using copper infrastructure. This is widely dispersed throughout the country and immediately evident in most business and residential premises as the standard telephone network. This infrastructure is distributed nationwide by telephone exchanges, from which it locally extends into customer premises. The physical copper connection between the customer premises and the telephone exchange is known as a "local loop". There are about 10.1 million local loops and about 5,120 local exchanges. Local loops can carry services in two ways, unconditioned and shared. Unconditioned local loop services (ULLS) are "unconditioned" in that the electrical properties of the loop are not altered by any physically connected equipment. Local sharing services (LSS) are unconditioned local loops where one carrier uses the lower frequencies range of the line, known as the "voiceband" used in regular telephony, whilst that same carrier or another uses the higher frequency range of that same line for high speed services such as ADSL internet.

Prior to Federation, the PSTN infrastructure that then existed was owned and maintained by the colonial governments. The Constitution provided for the transfer of the network to the Commonwealth of Australia, who operated the network through the Postmaster-General's Department. In July 1975, the assets constituting the PSTN were transferred to a body then called the Australian Telecommunications Commission, later changed to the Australian Telecommunications Corporation, created under the Telecommunications Act 1975 and began trading as a monopoly under the name Telecom Australia. In a Parliamentary move to invite competition, Telstra, then known as the Australian and Overseas Telecommunications Corporation, was incorporated under the Corporations Law of ACT in November 1991, as a company limited by shares, the sole shareholder being the Australian Commonwealth. The PSTN was then vested in Telstra, as of 1 February 1992, in accordance with the Telecommunications Act 1991 of which one of the stated objects is "creating a regulatory environment for the supply of telecommunications services which promotes competition and fair and efficient market conduct".

Once privatised, Telstra operation became subject to the Trade Practices Act 1974 which requires that competitors be given access to the PSTN and related services, and empowered The Australian Competition & Consumer Commission (ACCC) to make determinations about the terms and conditions of access obligations and the pricing principles applicable to services relating to the PSTN, and in this case ULLS and LSS. It was this enforced pricing model that Telstra rejected, claiming they are forced to provide wholesale access to competitors at below cost price, which they believed amounted to an acquisition of property other than on just terms contrary to Section 51(xxxi) of the Constitution. Thus, Telstra began proceedings in the High Court of Australia against the Commonwealth, the ACCC, and eleven of its competitors, seeking adequate compensation and the ability to charge its competitors more for access. The eleven competitors involved were internet service providers Primus Telecommunications, Optus, Chime Communications, XYZED, PowerTel, Request Broadband, NEC Australia, Macquarie Telecom, Amcom, Adam Internet and Agile.

=== The Telecommunications Access Regime ===
The PSTN was vested in Telstra, with effect from 1 February 1992, under the Telecommunications Act 1991 which commenced on 1 July 1991. This meant that all of its provisions had commenced prior to the PSTN actually being vested in Telstra. This legislation limited a former monopoly control over the telecommunications industry by promoting the fair competition subject to the Australian Telecommunications Access Regime set out in Part XIC of the Trade Practices Act. This regime applies to telecommunications services which, following a public inquiry, are declared by the ACCC as "declared services". Section 152AL(3) of the TPA provides for the declaration of these services subject to Part XIC. Once a service becomes a declared service the service provider that provides that service must then adhere to the standard access obligations as described in Section 152AR. Part XIC of the Trade Practices Act was inserted in that Act by the Trade Practices Amendment (Telecommunications) Act 1997.

== Argument ==
Telstra rejected the regulation of ULLS and LSS under Part XIC of the Trade Practices Act, alleging that the wholesale access price caps imposed on it by the ACCC do not allow it to recover the operating costs of the actual service being accessed and retailed by a competitor, alleging that this amounted to a compulsory acquisition of Telstra property by the Commonwealth, and access-seeking competitors, on unjust terms contrary to section 51(xxxi) of the Constitution. Section 51(xxxi) of the Constitution states that the Parliament has legislative power to create laws relating to:

the acquisition of property on just terms from any State or person for any purpose in respect of which the Parliament has power to make laws.

=== Impugned provisions ===
The argument made on Telstra's behalf focused directly on Sections 152AL(3) and 152AR of the Trade Practices Act, and asked whether these two Sections, in their applications to ULL and LSS, were beyond the legislative powers of parliament by way of Section 51(xxxi). Therefore, rejecting the validity of Sections 152AL(3) and 152AR which it claimed affect an unconstitutional acquisition of Telstra property by the Commonwealth on unjust terms. As mentioned earlier these two Sections provide for the declaration of services by the ACCC and impose standard access obligations, terms and conditions which include the monetary price bracket limiting what Telstra is allowed to charge its competitors for access to declared services. If then, as Telstra continued to argue, terms and conditions may be fixed for its compliance with standard access obligations in respect to local loops, ULL and LSS, which are terms that differ from those that would be fixed in arm's length (all parties being independent and equal) bargaining between it and the access seeker, the provisions that lead to that result provide for an acquisition of property otherwise than on just terms.

=== Section 152EB ===
Telstra submitted that this conclusion is not denied by the provisions of Section 152EB which deal expressly with the subject of just terms. If a Commonwealth law provides for the acquisition of property on unjust terms, then Section 51(xxxi) renders that law invalid, since it is beyond the legislative powers of the Commonwealth to create such a law, then Section 152EB, the final provision of Part XIC of the Trade Practices Act, acts to save that law from invalidity, via reasonable compensation by the Commonwealth. Telstra argued that this provision did not save the impugned provisions from invalidity stating that relevant acquisitions "occur by the imposition of the standard access obligations on carriers or providers pursuant to Section 152AR" and not by any ACCC determination. Furthermore, any acquisition only comes into operation when a relevant request for the service is made by a provider, and not by any ACCC determination. Telstra stated that Section 152EB should be considered engaged only in respect to determinations that effect an acquisition, and that the only relevant determinations are those made by the ACCC. Thus, Telstra argued, this provision did not apply to any acquisition effected by Section 152AR since the relevant acquisition is effected by the provider's request for access engaging the standard obligations under Section 152AR, and not by any determination made by the ACCC.

The High Court rejected Telstra's interpretation of Section 152EB by stating that the said provision refers to determinations that would "result in" an acquisition of property on unjust terms, and not to determinations that would "effect" such an acquisition. The High Court also pointed to the fact that Telstra's argument involves a dispute about the terms and conditions of complying with the service access obligations fixed by ACCC determinations, thus enabling the operation of Section 152EB.

As a result of the High Court's position, Telstra next suggested that the impugned provisions do effect an acquisition of property, and just terms must then be afforded by the operation of Section 152EB, removing any claim of invalidity so long as the Commonwealth pays reasonable compensation. At this stage the High Court found it important to consider the nature of the "acquisition of property".

=== Acquisition of property? ===
In Australian courts Section 51(xxxi) of the Constitution focuses on matters of substance rather than form, and therefore the definitions of "acquisition" and "property" are to be interpreted liberally. In the case of Yanner v. Eaton. it was mentioned that the word "property" is often used to refer to something that belongs to another, though in law, "property" does not refer to a thing; it is a description of a legal relationship with a thing. It refers to a degree of power that is recognised in law as power permissibly exercised over the thing. The concept of "property" may be elusive. Usually it is treated as a "bundle of rights". In this same case it was also accepted that "an extensive frame of reference is created by the notion that "property" consists primarily in control over access. Much of our false thinking about property stems from the residual perception that "property" is itself a thing or resource rather than a legally endorsed concentration of power over things and resources."

Such considerations were vital to the matter concerning Telstra, as they submitted that the physical disconnection of the local loop from its equipment and its physical connection to another carrier’s equipment constituted an acquisition of property. Due to these physical acts, Telstra claimed it lost "control of and the ability to use the infrastructure" which it "owned".

The competing carriers, listed as defending parties, chose to shift the argument from the physical steps in connecting and disconnecting ULL and LLS to that of whether there had ever been any actual "possession" on their part, since Telstra installs, repairs, and maintain the network at all times. All connections and disconnections of ULL and LLS are carried out by Telstra, regardless of whether those services relate to its own customers or customers of competing carriers. These same defendants pointed to the fact that end-users, the customers, can and do chose which service provider connects equipment to the local loops entering their premises, and as long as that choice is not Telstra, then Telstra have no use for that local loop.

The defendant's arguments sought to invoke certain elements of the long line of cases in the Australian High Court in which Section 51(xxxi) has been considered. In addressing these arguments the Court decided that rather than begin from the classification of rule and its exceptions, it would instead recognise observations made by Brennan CJ, Toohey, Gaudron, McHugh and Gummow JJ in Victoria v. The Commonwealth (Industrial Relations Act Case):

"It is well established that the guarantee effected by s 51(xxxi) of the Constitution extends to protect against the acquisition, other than on just terms, of "every species of valuable right and interest including ... choses in action". It has been held to prohibit the extinguishment of vested causes of action. At least that is so if the extinguishment results "in a direct benefit or financial gain ... and the cause of action is one that arises under the general law"."

== Judgment ==
The High Court held that there were three key factors on the history of the Australian communications industry that led to the conclusion that operation of the access regime did not result in an acquisition of property on unjust terms. Firstly the PSTN (including the local loops in dispute) which Telstra now "owns" was originally owned by the Commonwealth itself. Secondly, prior to the vesting of the PSTN (and local loops) in Telstra's predecessor, the Telecommunications Act 1991 had commenced on 1 July 1991, establishing the access regime that gave competitors the rights to interconnect to the PSTN and to obtain access to services it supplies. Thirdly, at the time the PSTN was vested in Telstra, Telstra was wholly owned by the Commonwealth. And so it was maintained that when the PSTN was transferred from the Commonwealth to Telstra's predecessor, Telstra's right over the network were always subject to the access rights of its competitors to its network and services. Thus, the High Court unanimously dismissed Telstra's case holding that Sections 152AL(3) and 152AR of the Trade Practices Act were not invalid and that Telstra never actually owned any of the assets that comprise the PSTN except under and in accordance with the legislative provisions for "promoting ... competition in the telecommunications industry generally and among carriers". Furthermore, it was stated that Telstra's argument was "synthetic and unreal" because it was based on an assumption that Telstra has greater rights over the PSTN than it actually has.

== Consequences ==
In a media release on its website, dated 8 March 2008, Telstra announced that it accepted the High Court's ruling and stood by its decision to challenge the ACCC's powers under Section 51(xxxi) of the Constitution, though believes Australia lost an opportunity for further broadband investment when the regulatory regime that rewards competitors who "ride on Telstra’s network rather than invest in Australia" was upheld. Other commentators believed this outcome to be a clear rebuttal to Telstra's "obsession with privatisation for its own sake" and protection of its remaining monopoly under the direction of CEO at the time Sol Trujillo, a United States telecommunications executive with a history of aggressive litigation towards the US government and its regulators, who was hired by the Telstra board for his ability to uphold a "culture of litigating in order to protect its monopoly privileges". Had such privileges as those relating to ULL and SSL been upheld, Telstra would be able to charge monopoly-inflated prices for access to its network, thus reducing competition and increasing consumer access fees. Exploitation of such monopoly control would result in increased access costs for competitors, their private and business customers, and eventually, all Australian online services. After Trujillo's resignation from Telstra in February 2009, new CEO David Thodey reached out to the Australian Government and regulators such as the ACCC in an effort to repair the relationships damaged during his predecessor's reign. The taking down of its propaganda website, which the company used to criticise regulators and competitors, marked the removal of one of the final vestiges of the Trujillo era.
