= BMG Music v. Gonzalez =

U.S. court case

- Court: United States Court of Appeals for the Seventh Circuit
- Full case name: BMG Music, et al. v. Cecelia Gonzalez
- Decided: December 9, 2005
- Citation: 430 F.3d 888

Case history
- Prior action: 2005 WL 106592 (N.D. Ill. Jan. 7, 2005 ) (granting summary judgment for plaintiffs)
- Subsequent actions: cert. denied, ___ U.S. ___, 126 S. Ct. 2032, 164 L. Ed. 2d 782 (2006)

Holding
- A user of file-sharing software who downloads unauthorized copies of copyrighted songs cannot claim that they were merely "sampling" the works for possible future purchase, and that claim does not qualify for the fair use defense.

Court membership
- Judges sitting: Frank H. Easterbrook, Terence T. Evans, and Ann Claire Williams

BMG Music v. Gonzalez, 430 F.3d 888 (7th Cir. 2005), was a court decision in which the United States Court of Appeals for the Seventh Circuit ruled that a record company could sue a person who engaged in online sharing of music files for copyright infringement. The decision is noteworthy for rejecting the defendant's fair use defense, which had rested upon her contention that she was merely "sampling" songs with the intention of possibly purchasing the downloaded songs in the future, a practice known informally as "try before you buy".

== Facts ==
Over a period of several weeks, defendant Cecelia Gonzalez downloaded an estimated 1,370 copyrighted songs onto her computer using the KaZaA peer-to-peer file sharing service, without authorization from the holders of the copyrights of the underlying compositions and sound recordings. Gonzalez owned compact discs containing some fraction of the songs that she downloaded. The parties disagreed on precisely how many of Gonzalez's downloads represented songs that she already owned on CD, but it was undisputed that she had never owned authorized copies of 30 of the songs that she downloaded. Gonzalez retained at least these 30 songs on her computer's hard drive even after deciding not to purchase them on CD.

== Lower court proceedings ==
Four recording companies who owned the copyrights for the songs that Gonzalez downloaded filed a lawsuit accusing her of copyright infringement. The United States District Court for the Northern District of Illinois ruled in favor of the plaintiff record companies. The district court rejected Gonzalez's fair use defense against the infringement claim. The court awarded the companies $22,500 in statutory damages (representing the statutory minimum of $750 per song multiplied by the defendant's 30 infringing downloads), and issued a permanent injunction forbidding Gonzalez from downloading copyrighted recordings owned by the plaintiffs in the future. Gonzalez appealed to the Seventh Circuit Court of Appeals.

== Appeals court decision ==
The Seventh Circuit affirmed the district court's decision in its entirety. The circuit court first reasoned that the songs that Gonzalez had downloaded were infringing copies of the copyrighted originals, rejecting her analogy to the time shifting doctrine handed down in the Supreme Court's landmark Sony Corp. of America v. Universal City Studios, Inc. precedent.

In its analysis of the fair use argument, the circuit court considered the four factors of that defense that may or may not have worked in Gonzalez's favor. The court found that her unauthorized downloading of copyright songs did not qualify for the fair use defense, stating: "Gonzalez was not engaged in a nonprofit use; she downloaded (and kept) whole copyrighted songs [...]; and she did this despite the fact that these works often are sold per song as well as per album.."

Gonzalez argued that downloading songs for the purpose of "sampling" would have a positive effect on the market for those songs, spurring sales of the songs that she enjoyed enough to purchase legitimately. The circuit court declared that this argument was both factually unsupported and inconsistent with the Supreme Court's then-recent decision about file sharing in MGM Studios, Inc. v. Grokster, Ltd. and related cases on modern Internet-enabled copyright infringement:

As she tells the tale, downloading on a try-before-you-buy basis is good advertising for copyright proprietors, expanding the value of their inventory. The Supreme Court thought otherwise in Grokster, with considerable empirical support. As file sharing has increased over the last four years, the sales of recorded music have dropped by approximately 30%. Perhaps other economic factors contributed, but the events likely are related. Music downloaded for free from the Internet is a close substitute for purchased music; many people are bound to keep the downloaded files without buying originals. That is exactly what Gonzalez did for at least 30 songs. It is no surprise, therefore, that the only appellate decision on point has held that downloading copyrighted songs cannot be defended as fair use, whether or not the recipient plans to buy songs she likes well enough to spring for.

The circuit court also upheld the award of $22,500 in statutory damages against Gonzalez, recognizing that this amount represented the then-current minimum award provided under the 1976 Copyright Act for per-song infringement claims. Finally, the circuit court upheld the district court's permanent injunction prohibiting Gonzalez from downloading copyrighted works without authorization in the future.

Gonzalez appealed again to the Supreme Court of the United States, but her request for certiorari was denied.

== Impact ==
The circuit court's ruling in BMG Music v. Gonzalez was praised in some quarters for clarifying the ability of copyright holders to initiate suits against people who engaged in unauthorized file sharing on the Internet, and for influencing the development of paid music services like iTunes as a solution to unauthorized copying. Conversely, some scholars described the ruling as enabling the persecution of individuals like Gonzalez by record companies to make a point about widespread file sharing, most of which remained uncontrolled and unprosecuted, thus leaving unsettled questions about the appropriate legal responses to new consumer behaviors.
