= Friendica =

Free software for distributed social networks

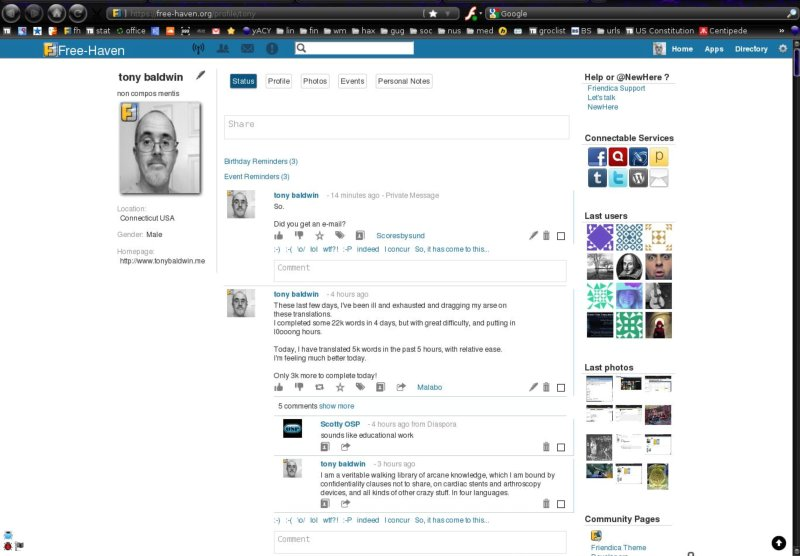
- Original author: Mike Macgirvin
- Developer: Friendica community
- Release: July 2010 (mistpark)
- Stable release: 2026.01 / May 21, 2026
- Written in: PHP
- Operating system: Cross-platform
- Type: Social network service
- License: AGPLv3+
- Website: friendi.ca
- Repository: github.com/friendica/friendica

Friendica (formerly Friendika, originally Mistpark) is a free and open-source software federated social network. It forms one part of the Fediverse, an interconnected and decentralized network of independently operated servers.

== Features ==
Friendica users can connect with others via their own Friendica server, but may also fully integrate contacts from other platforms including Diaspora, Pump.io, GNU social, email, Discourse and more recently ActivityPub (including Mastodon, Pleroma and Pixelfed) and Bluesky into their 'newsfeed'. In addition to these two way connections, users can also use Friendica as a publishing platform to post content to WordPress, Tumblr, Insanejournal and Libertree. Posting to Google+ was also supported until that service was shut down. In addition, RSS feeds can be ingested. Because users are distributed across many servers, their "addresses" consist of a username, the "@" symbol, and the domain name of the Friendica instance in the same manner email addresses are formed. Twitter support was available but was deprecated due to API changes under Elon Musk's leadership rendering it unusable.

Most of the functionality from major microblogging and social networking platforms are available in Friendica; for example, tagging users and groups via "@ mentions"; direct messages; hashtags; photo albums; "likes"; "dislikes"; comments; and re-shares of publicly visible posts. Published items can be edited and updated across the network. Comprehensive settings for privacy and the public visibility of posts allow users to regulate who can read which contributions, or see specific information about the user. Users can also create multiple profiles, allowing different groups of people (such as friends, or work mates) to see a different profile entirely when viewing the same page. User accounts can be downloaded or deleted, and can be imported to a different Friendica server if so required. Public forums can be created under different accounts, which can be switched between if the accounts are registered with the same email address.

== Development ==
There is no corporation behind Friendica. The developers work on a voluntary basis and the project is run informally; the platform itself is used for the communication between the developers. There are different forums within Friendica, such as "Friendica Developers" and "Friendica Support". The source code of Friendica is hosted on GitHub.

== Installation ==
The developers aim to make installation of the software as simple as possible for technical laymen. They argue that decentralization on small servers is a key condition for the freedom of users and their self-determination. The difficulty level is similar to an installation of WordPress. However, the installing on shared hosting is sometimes difficult because of missing PHP5 modules. Some volunteers also run public servers so that newcomers can also avoid the installation of their own software.

== List of clients ==
Friendica implements multiple client-server API variants simultaneously. Along with endpoints needed to use enhanced Friendica features, it also implements the API used by GNU social, Twitter and since version 2021.06 also the one used by Mastodon. As a result, most GNU social and Mastodon clients can be used for Friendica. Examples of Friendica compatible clients include: Raccoon for Friendica, Friendiqa, Fedilab, AndStatus, Twidere and DiCa for Android, friendly for Sailfish OS, friclicli (CLI client), choqok and Friendiqa for Linux and Friendica Mobile for Windows 10.

== Reception ==
Friendica was cited in January 2012 by Infoshop News as an "alternative to Google+ and Facebook" to be used on the Occupy Nigeria movement. In January 2012 Free Software Foundation Europe's blog cited Friendica as a reasonable alternative to centralized and controlled social networks such as Facebook or Google+. Biblical Notes writer J. Randal Matheny described Friendica in January 2012 as "One social networking option flying under the radar until recently deserves consideration as an already stable platform with a wide range of options, applications, plug-ins, and possibilities for opening up the Internet." In February 2012, the German computer magazine c't wrote: "Friendica demonstrates how decentralized social networks can become widely accepted." Another German publication, the professional magazine t3n listed Friendica as a Facebook rival in an online article in March 2012 about Facebook alternatives. It compared Friendica with similar social networks like Diaspora and identi.ca. MSN Tech & Gadgets contributor Emma Boyes wrote about Friendica in May 2012: "why you'll love it: you can use it to access all the other social networks and get recommendations of new friends and groups to join. Friendica is open source and decentralised. There's no corporation behind it and there are extensive privacy settings. You can choose from a variety of user interfaces and it boasts some cool features—for instance, being able to key in a list of your interests and use the 'profile match' feature to recommend other users who share them with you. A word of warning, though, the site is not as user-friendly as the others on this list, so it may be this one is one for the geeks."

== Later reviews ==
The acquisition of Twitter by Elon Musk revitalized public interest in Fediverse technologies in April 2022. Friendica received favorable reviews, with a PCMag article describing it as "mostly comparable to Facebook", drawing a parallel to Google+ and highlighting using it "for planning events, and its multiple profile feature means you can show a different face to your friends, coworkers, and family".

The September 2022 issue of Linux Magazine contains a detailed comparison and walk-through of registering to and using basic functions of Diaspora, Friendica and Mastodon. They describe Friendica as "intuitive" and highlight the "huge choice of account settings" and that "Friendica does not require any specific hardware, so you can use an old computer system as a server."

== Vulnerabilities ==
In September 2020, a hotfix was released to patch a security vulnerability that could leak sensitive information from the server environment since versions released in April 2019 (develop branch) and June 2019 (stable).

== See also ==
- Comparison of software and protocols for distributed social networking
- Distributed social network
