= Christine Lemmer-Webber =

American software engineer and co-editor of ActivityPub

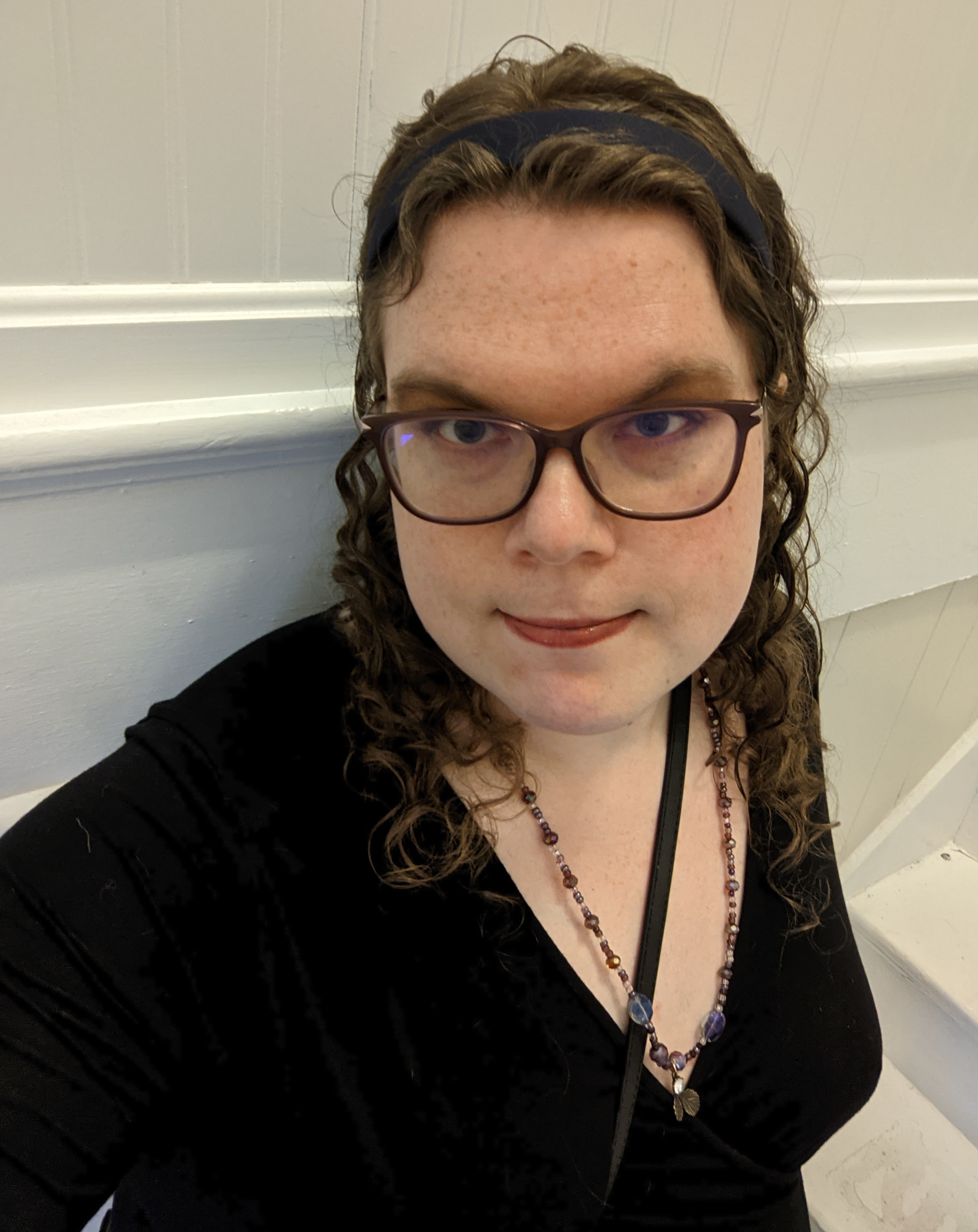
- Born: Christopher Allan Webber; September 26, 1984
- Employer: Spritely Networked Communities Institute
- Works: MediaGoblin
- Website: dustycloud.org

Christine Lemmer-Webber (born September 26, 1984) is an American software engineer, best known for her lead authorship and co-editorship of ActivityPub. She is currently the Executive Director at Spritely Institute.

== Career ==
In the early 2000s, Christine was tech lead for Creative Commons.

In 2011, Christine co-founded GNU MediaGoblin, for which she won the O'Reilly Open Source Award in 2015.

Christine was lead author and co-editor of the 2018 ActivityPub standard, a W3C standard for decentralized federated social networking. It is most well-known for being the framework of Fediverse platforms such as Mastodon, Lemmy and PeerTube among others.

She currently works on the Spritely distributed application framework being built by the Spritely Institute.

== Personal life ==
Christine was raised in Milwaukee, Wisconsin and resides in Easthampton, Massachusetts as of July 2023. She came out as nonbinary in 2020, and then as a trans woman in 2021.

Christine has been married to Morgan Lemmer-Webber since 2009. The two host the podcast FOSS and Crafts together.
