= Threads (social network) =

Meta Platforms social networking service

- Logo used since 2026

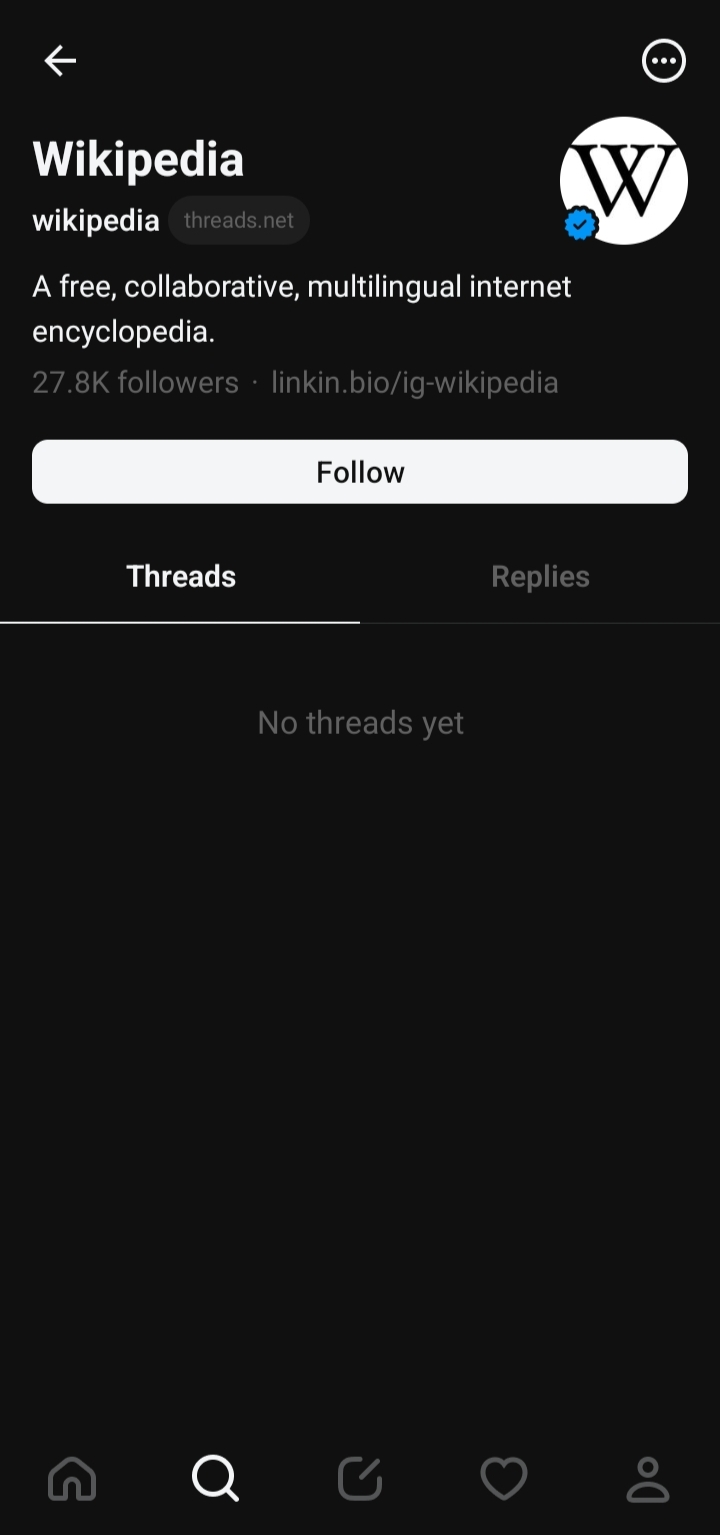
- Screenshot The Threads account page for Wikipedia
- Website type: Social networking platform
- Available in: 31 languages
- List of languages: Chinese (Simplified and Traditional); Croatian; Czech; Danish; Dutch; English; Finnish; French; German; Greek; Hindi; Hungarian; Indonesian; Italian; Japanese; Korean; Malay; Norwegian; Polish; Portuguese; Romanian; Russian; Slovak; Spanish; Swedish; Tagalog; Thai; Turkish; Ukrainian; Vietnamese
- Area served: Over 100 countries
- Owner: Meta Platforms
- Website: www.threads.com
- Registration: Required to interact (reply, like) but otherwise optional on the web, required for mobile apps
- Users: 500 million monthly active (June 16, 2026)
- Launched: July 5, 2023; 3 years ago
- Current status: Active
- Native clients on: Android; iOS; Web

Threads is an American social media microblogging service operated by Meta Platforms. Threads requires an Instagram account to use the service and features integration between the two platforms. Upon its launch in 2023, Threads became the fastest-growing consumer software application in history, gaining over 100 million users in its first five days and surpassing the record previously set by ChatGPT. As of June 16, 2026, Threads has over 500 million monthly active users.

After Elon Musk's acquisition of Twitter in October 2022, Meta employees explored the concept of introducing text-based functionality to Instagram. This feature, known as Instagram Notes, was rolled out in December 2022. The company subsequently began developing a separate app focused on text-based posts. Development on Threads—internally known as "Project 92"—commenced in January 2023, with the platform officially launching on July 5, 2023. Threads immediately became available in 100 countries, but until December 14, 2023, had delayed its launch in the European Union as it waited for regulatory clarity from the European Commission regarding the service's data collection policies.

== History ==
=== Predecessor ===
In October 2019, Threads was introduced as a separate app available for Android and iOS. This app's functionality resembled that of Snapchat, allowing users to communicate through messaging and video chats. It was integrated with Instagram's "Close friends" feature, so that users could send images, photos, and texts privately to others, and was embedded with Instagram's photo editing system, and introduced the ability to share a status with other registered users. Instagram discontinued this version of Threads in December 2021, mainly due to most of its features being rolled out on Instagram, as well as low usage compared to other social media applications. Approximately 220,000 users globally downloaded the original Threads app, less than 0.1% of Instagram's monthly active users.

=== Development and announcement ===
On April 14, 2022, business magnate Elon Musk attempted a takeover of the social media platform Twitter. On October 27, Musk acquired the company for US$44 billion in an agreement with the company's board. As Twitter's owner and CEO, Musk implemented several changes to the platform, including monetizing the platform's application programming interface (API); his views and policy changes concerned many advertisers, some of whom left the platform. In November 2022, Meta employees started discussing the possibility of creating a separate app for Instagram Notes, an upcoming text-based feature designed for Instagram. That month, Meta Platforms CEO Mark Zuckerberg—seeking to take advantage of the situation—discussed Twitter-like features the company could add to Instagram with the service's head, Adam Mosseri. At the end of the discussion, Mosseri agreed to build a separate app with a planned release date of January 2023.

Amid several layoffs at Meta Platforms, Mosseri and product leader Connor Hayes assembled a team comprising two product managers, two designers, and dozens of engineers from Messenger, Facebook, and Instagram, growing to fifty-six people by the app's launch. The team favored agility, opting to build features, such as searching for content, later. Development began that January under the codename "P92". Moneycontrol obtained information about the app in March, and The Verge published details from an internal company-wide meeting in June. The project, referred to as "Project 92", was described by chief product officer Chris Cox as the company's response to Twitter. Meta Platforms had reportedly secured commitments from some celebrities and was in talks with Oprah Winfrey and the Dalai Lama. Development was completed in five months using the Jetpack Compose framework.

In July, developer Alessandro Paluzzi tweeted about the release of Project 92 on the Google App Store under the name Threads and shared several screenshots of its features; the app was taken down shortly after. On July 3, Threads appeared on the Apple App Store with a release date set for July 6. Additionally, a website for the app featured a countdown clock leading up to the service's launch. Mosseri intended to release the app a week later, but pushed the release date after Musk implemented a rate limit on the number of tweets users could read. The countdown expired on July 5 at 7:00 p.m. EDT after pushing the release date several hours further to account for international app stores, and Threads officially launched in one hundred countries. Meta Platforms was at the time awaiting regulatory clarification from the European Commission due to concerns and uncertainties regarding the service's data collection policies. According to Mosseri, the original name was considered to be Textagram, with the runner-up name being Epigram.

=== Launch ===
Within a day of its launch, Threads had gained thirty million users, surpassing the previous record set by ChatGPT and making it the fastest-growing platform in history. The early active user numbers of the platform were not sustained at the time, and the user base of the app plummeted more than 80% to 8 million daily active users by the end of July 2023.

On the same day, lawyers representing Twitter threatened legal action against Meta Platforms, alleging that the company had used trade secrets to develop the Threads app. After the launch, Mark Zuckerberg broke his eleven-year silence on Twitter. He posted a Spider-Man meme to signify the similarity between Twitter and Threads.

On August 22, 2023, Meta launched the web version of the Threads app.

On December 14, 2023, Threads was launched in the European Union after a five-month delay due to privacy concerns raised by regulatory firms and the tight integration between Threads and Instagram accounts.

Meta announced that from April 29, 2024, Threads would be temporarily shut down in Turkey. This was due to local rulings on its data-sharing with Instagram. Threads returned in Turkey on June 17, 2026.

In April 2026, Meta introduced Live Chats on Threads, a feature that enables users to participate in real-time public conversations during live events within the platform's communities.

== Appearance and features ==
Designed as a platform for real-time conversations and sharing, Threads aims to provide users with a similar experience to Twitter. Threads prioritizes public dialogues over private communications, commonly known as microblogging, and is closely linked to Instagram, its sister social networking service.

Accompanied by the launch of Threads, Meta announced their vision for the app to be a "positive and creative space to express your ideas".

Users can create posts consisting of up to 500 characters of text or 5 minutes of video content (compared to Twitter's 280 characters of text and 2 minutes 20 seconds of video content for non-paying users). While Threads does not have a trending stories feature similar to other common social media features, it now has a Popular Communities feature as of October 2025. This feature takes topic tags and creates niche communities focused on specific topics like sports or popular TV shows for users to engage with personalized interests.

In response to user feedback, Threads introduced a new home feed for posts along with several updates to the social media app. These changes included the capability to edit posts, translation into multiple languages, and an improved user interface for switching between different Threads accounts.

Threads has also introduced a reposting feature which is visible on each users' profile tab and in their following feed.

Threads has the same community guidelines as Instagram, banning content such as nudity, sexual intercourse, and recreational drugs.

Originally accessed through the URL "threads.net", Threads uses the URL "threads.com" as of April 2025, with the original URL redirecting to the current one.

In May 2026, Threads introduced a redesigned logo and updated wordmark as a part of a broader branding refresh for the platform.

=== Direct Messaging (DM) ===
In July 2025, Threads introduced a native Direct Messaging (DM) feature, moving away from its initial reliance on Instagram's inbox for private communication. This standalone functionality allows users to manage private conversations via a dedicated inbox icon within the Threads interface. At its inception, Meta restricted the feature to users aged 18 and older, initially allowing DMs only between mutual followers on Threads or Instagram.

The messaging system is protected by the company's existing privacy standards and safety infrastructure, including the ability to filter message requests into a dedicated folder and block unwanted contacts. Following its initial release, the platform expanded messaging capabilities in September 2025 to include message requests from non-followers, as well as support for group chats with up to 50 participants. While the feature supports rich media such as photos, videos, and voice notes, it notably launched without end-to-end encryption (E2EE), drawing criticism regarding its privacy compared to other Meta-owned services like WhatsApp.

=== ActivityPub support ===
At launch in July 2023, Meta stated that Threads would eventually support the ActivityPub protocol.

Starting in early 2024, Meta implemented a few aspects of ActivityPub in Threads, starting with making posts from select Threads accounts accessible by users of ActivityPub platforms. Meta team members said that they would continue this process and support more ActivityPub integration (as possibly only an 'opt-in' feature), taking "the better part of a year".

On March 21, 2024, Threads introduced a "beta" feature that allowed Threads users whose accounts were public to make them visible on the fediverse, and to see the number of "likes" they had received, but not be notified of boosts or replies. Except for countries that are a part of the European Union, Meta rolled out the connection to the fediverse in June 2024.

As of December 2024, users from the fediverse can follow Threads accounts, and Threads users can follow users in the fediverse outside of Threads.

=== Account integration with Instagram ===
Threads accounts are closely integrated with Instagram accounts. By default, Threads and Instagram accounts share the same username, profile picture, and display name, although the profile picture and display name can be customized.

Users can choose which accounts that they follow on Instagram will carry over to Threads, either with the other person's Threads account already created or set to automatically follow them once an account is created.

Users who decided to terminate their Threads account had to delete their associated Instagram account as well. This caused EU countries to delay making Threads available there. This led users who disliked Threads to warn other Instagram users not to open an account on Threads, because they could risk losing their Instagram account as well if they ever wanted to delete Threads.

As of December 2023, this was no longer the case; users can delete or temporarily disable their Threads account without affecting their Instagram account.

=== Communities ===
On October 22, 2025, Meta officially introduced Communities on Threads, public spaces where users can join discussions centered on shared interests, building on the platform's existing topic tags and custom feeds features. At launch, more than 100 communities were available, covering subjects such as the NBA and WNBA, television, and K-pop, each featuring a custom "Like" emoji exclusive to members. Unlike X's Communities, which are user-created and limit participation to members, Threads Communities are created and managed by Meta, with non-members able to view and engage in discussions. Community membership is public and displayed on user profiles, with joined communities automatically pinned to the feeds menu.

On December 15, 2025, Meta expanded the feature to over 200 interest topics and began testing "community champion" badges for highly active members, along with "flair" labels that allow users to display specific interests within a community, with flair options set by community champions and appearing on all posts made by that member within the community.

=== Ghost posts ===
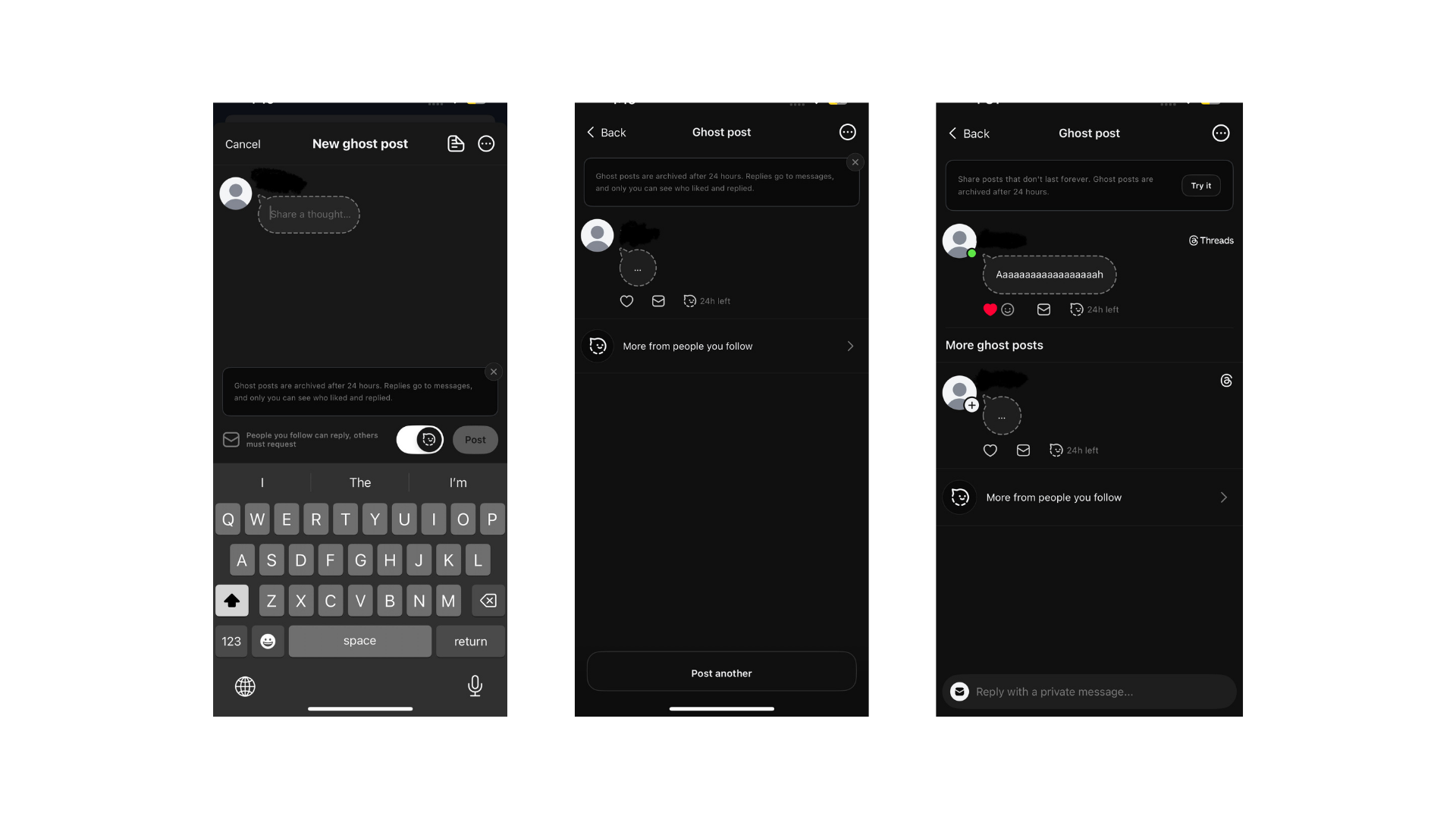
Threads ghost post creation screens and feed example

On October 27, 2025, Threads launched "ghost posts," a feature allowing users to share posts that are automatically archived after 24 hours. Ghost posts appear in others' feeds marked with a dotted speech bubble and are created by toggling a ghost icon in the compose screen. Replies are routed privately to the original poster's direct message inbox rather than appearing publicly, and only the poster can see the number of likes and replies received. After 24 hours, the posts disappear from public view but remain accessible to the poster via an archived section in settings. Meta described the feature as designed to encourage low-stakes sharing of unfiltered thoughts without the pressure of permanence. Ghost posts are text-only, cannot include photos or images, will not be shared to the fediverse, and while the original post can be edited, replies cannot.

=== Advertising ===
Threads has started rolling out ads in the early 2026. Previousely Meta CEO Mark Zuckerberg stated that monetization would not take place until the app had "hundreds of millions" of users.

=== Web Features and Updates ===
In April 2025, Meta introduced several updates to enhance the Threads web experience. These updates included a redesigned interface with customizable columns, support for drafting and saving posts, improved search functionality, and expanded access to trending topics and user activity. The update also introduced performance and navigation improvements aimed at providing a more efficient desktop experience.

=== AI Support Assistance ===
In March 2026, Meta rolled out new Artificial intelligence support across its platforms, including Meta, Facebook, and Instagram. Mainly designed to assist with features including password resets, profile and privacy setting updates, and scam reporting, this feature can respond to users in seconds and is available 24/7.

== Userbase ==
After its launch, Threads grew rapidly, reaching 100 million users after five days. Third-party observers claim that the number of daily active users has dropped by 20% after the initial five days, and that there has been a 50% reduction in user engagement. Moreover, the average time spent on the app is said to have decreased from the July 6 peak of around 20 minutes per user to eight minutes on July 10, four minutes on July 21, and just under three minutes on August 1.

Users (millions)	2	5	10	20	30	70	90	100	200	275	400
Time since launch	2 hours	4h	7h	12h	16h	2d	4d	5d	394d	497d	635d
Ref.											

=== Decline in the months after launch ===
Within its first year, Threads amassed approximately 275 million monthly active users.

In response to the emergence of Threads and other alternatives, Twitter implemented a number of changes to retain its user base. These included policy shifts and feature enhancements aimed at improving user engagement and satisfaction.

After Threads reached about 105 million users on July 11, 2023, Meta stopped disclosing its numbers of users. Despite the initial growth in sign-ups, the number of daily active users on the platform fell by 70% by July 17, down from its peak on July 7. On August 3, 2023, CNN wrote that Threads was facing challenges in retaining users and was considering the addition of "retention-driving hooks". By mid-August, the daily number of users on Threads had fallen by over 80%. The number of daily Android users had also fallen by 79% from 49.3 million to 10.3 million. Meta CEO Mark Zuckerberg claimed in August 2023 that the decrease in users was 'normal', and said he anticipated retention to improve as new features were added to the platform. Threads initially attracted users migrating from Twitter, but retaining those early enthusiasts may be questionable. Although some initial migration barriers might be short-lived, the enduring appeal of established platforms like Twitter poses a significant challenge.

In November 2023, Similarweb estimated that Threads received 49.4 million desktop visits globally for the month, roughly 100 times less than X's 5.9 billion visits. Compared to October 2023, global desktop traffic and Android mobile app usage for Twitter were down 4% and 2%, respectively. Threads' global desktop traffic held flat, but its Android mobile app usage was up 12.8% for the month. In the United States, X's mobile apps had more than eleven times the monthly active users in November 2023 compared to Threads. On July 3, 2024, Zuckerberg stated that Threads had over 175 million monthly active users. On August 1, 2024, Instagram head Adam Mosseri stated that Threads had crossed the milestone of 200 million users. On November 3, 2024, Mosseri announced that Threads had surpassed 275 million users during the previous day.

As of January 2026, Threads has pulled ahead of Twitter in active user count, with sources estimating 143 million daily active users.

=== Popularity in Taiwan ===
Early on, Threads was able to gain a large number of users in Taiwan because Twitter was rarely used there; however, many users became less active after satisfying their initial curiosity. The 2024 Taiwanese presidential election attracted a new wave of users specifically interested in politics. Supporters of the ruling Democratic Progressive Party (DPP) reported that their messages on Threads were reposted and promoted at a higher rate compared to Facebook, Instagram, or Twitter. This prompted other users, including those who had previously left the platform, to join in on the political conversations there. Threads was used to great effect by DPP supporters to protest against 2024 reforms, proposed by the opposition Kuomintang and Taiwan People's Party, that would grant the Legislative Yuan more oversight over the executive branch. It is also popular among Taiwanese independence activists and critics of China-friendly politicians.

== Reception ==
Threads faced privacy concerns over data collection policies.

By August 2025, Threads reached 400 million monthly users.

In January 2026, it reported 141.5M daily mobile users vs X's 125M.

=== Fedipact ===
The Anti-Meta Fedipact (or just Fedipact) is a pledge signed by various administrators of fediverse instances regarding the moderation of content originating from Threads. Signatories believe that Meta will employ an "embrace, extend, and extinguish" strategy and become an existential threat to the fediverse, with many criticizing Meta's moderation practices. These administrators have pledged to unconditionally defederate (i.e. block all communications) with Threads, making it impossible for their users to see and interact with content that is hosted on Threads and vice versa. While the majority of registered instances host relatively few users, the official developer-run instances of Pixelfed have also signed onto the pledge.

Co-creator of the Markdown markup language and technology blogger John Gruber criticized the pledge, commenting that "Any instance that defederates the upcoming Instagram instance is just going to isolate itself. It’ll be an island of misfit loser zealots". The "misfit loser zealots" portion of the quote in particular has been adopted by supporters of the pledge to ironically describe themselves.

== Legal issues ==
On the day of Threads' launch, Twitter issued a legal threat against it, claiming that it infringes on Twitter's intellectual property rights. In a letter directed to Meta's CEO, Twitter's lawyer alleged that Meta recruited numerous former Twitter employees who had access to Twitter's trade secrets and confidential information. Meta has denied these allegations, asserting that no former Twitter employees are involved in the Threads engineering team. Twitter also asked Meta to honor its robots.txt file and refrain from crawling or scraping its data. As the owner of X, Elon Musk challenged Meta by alleging theft of "trade secrets". He claimed that Zuckerberg persuaded former workers from Twitter to assist in constructing a "Twitter clone."

Access to Threads is currently blocked in Iran, China and Russia.

=== Threads Software and Meta ===
Possessing the "Threads" logo for over a decade, Threads Software Limited, a small company in the UK, has warned Meta of future lawsuits about using the name. In an official press release, the company's managing director, John Yardley, stated: "Taking on a US$150 billion company is not an easy decision for us to make. ... Our business now faces a serious threat from one of the largest technology companies in the world." At the time that Meta's Threads was launched, in July 2023, Threads Software's Facebook account was found to have been "shut down".

Threads Software refused Meta's bid for the "threads.app" domain, asserting it was not for sale. Threads Software Ltd. informed Meta of its request for "an injunction in the UK High Court" unless Meta stopped using the name "Threads". John Yardley, Threads Software's managing director, suggested that Meta intended to absorb the costs of litigation and to leverage ability to postpone the litigation in order to outmaneuver the smaller company.

=== American Threads and Meta ===
American Threads, a women's fashion brand, forced Meta to change the name to "@threadsapp" in their Instagram account when Meta's Threads first launched. The dissension faded after the retailer renewed its account username.

== Growth and problems ==
On July 5, 2023, Meta's Threads was officially opened to the public. The new app was "launched as a competitor to X, formerly known as Twitter". Instagram users can access the new app by logging in to their accounts. Over 100 million people started to use the app within five days. Meanwhile, the app is still inaccessible in Europe, waiting for the European Commission to go through "data policies" and give out the "regulatory clearance".

Meta claimed that Threads had reached 400 million monthly active users in August 2025, which increased to 500 million in June 2026.

=== User decline ===
Threads, considered to be the "fastest-growing platform in history", faced a rapid decrease in the number of users. Threads lost 80% of its users and was criticized by a British content writer for social media agencies, Joseph Rudd, for the lack of creators, influencers, and creator analytics.

== See also ==
- Bluesky
- Fediverse
- List of social networking services
- Mastodon
- Misskey
- Nostr
