= AT Protocol =

Decentralized social networking protocol

- Communication protocol

- A diagram of the AT Protocol federation architecture as of October 2024
- Abbreviation: ATproto, ATP
- Purpose: Distributed social network
- Developer: Bluesky Social PBC
- Introduction: October 18, 2022; 4 years ago
- Ports: 80, 443
- Website: atproto.com

The AT Protocol (Authenticated Transfer Protocol, pronounced "at protocol", commonly shortened to ATproto or "ATP") is a protocol and set of open standards for decentralized publishing and distribution of self-authenticating data within the social web. It serves as the technical foundation of the Bluesky social network, originally developed as a reference implementation for the protocol, as well as an ecosystem of interoperable social applications and services collectively referred to as the ATmosphere.

The AT Protocol aims to address perceived issues with earlier decentralized social networking protocols such as ActivityPub and Nostr; these include user experience, semantic interoperability, discoverability, network scalability, and portability of user data and social graphs. It employs a modular microservice architecture and a federated, server-agnostic user identity to enable seamless movement between network services, with the goal of providing an integrated online experience without dependence on any single privileged entity.

As of January 2026, the protocol's general architecture, user repository, and data synchronization specifications are in the process of standardization within the Internet Engineering Task Force (IETF). Further specifications—including data schemas, identity systems, OAuth implementation, and private/limited visibility data—are under development by Bluesky Social PBC. The company has said it may seek to standardize additional specifications through the IETF in the future, depending on the outcome of current efforts.

== Design ==
The AT Protocol is designed to facilitate the creation of federated identities, so that users can retain, manage, and customize one online identity across multiple platforms and services. Independent hosts and other network participants can access and serve any user content within the network by fetching content formatted as predefined data schemas from federated network-wide data streams. Bluesky Social describes the protocol as being "modeled after the open web".

Compared to other protocols for social networking such as ActivityPub, where implementations are typically designed as a monolithic server that hosts both user data and the application, it splits up these elements into smaller microservices, which can be used as needed.

AT Protocol clients and services interoperate through an HTTP API called XRPC (Cross-organizational Remote Procedure Calls) that uses JSON for sending and receiving associated data. Additionally, all data within the protocol that must be authenticated, referenced, or stored is encoded in CBOR.

=== User identity ===
AT Protocol's identity infrastructure

The AT Protocol utilizes a dual identifier system: a mutable handle, in the form of a domain name, and an immutable decentralized identifier (DID).

A handle serves as a verifiable user identifier. Verification is by either of two equivalent methods proving control of the domain name: Either a DNS query of a resource record with the same name as the handle, or a request for a text file from a Web service with the same name.

DIDs resolve to DID documents, which contain references to key user metadata, such as the user's handle, public keys, and data repository. While any DID method could, in theory, be used by the protocol if its components provide support for the method, in practice only two methods are supported ('blessed') by the protocol's reference implementations: did:plc and did:web. The validity of these identifiers can be verified by a registry which hosts the DID's associated document and a file that is hosted at a well-known location on the connected domain name, respectively.

The usage of these DID methods has been criticized for potentially compromising the decentralization of the protocol. The did:plc method in particular has been noted as being a single point of failure within the protocol, as its current implementation and general usage relies on a single registry hosted by Bluesky Social, with no system to independently verify the document's current state. The company has pledged to transfer the directory to an independent organization which will be incorporated as a Swiss association, as well as suggesting that the architecture of the PLC method could be moved away from its current model as a centralized single-writer registry.

Services can assign handles to new users upon signup using subdomains (e.g. @username.bsky.social). Alternatively, users can set a custom domain or subdomain as their handle (e.g. @username.com or @username.wikipedia.org) by adding a TXT record to the domain's records or by responding to HTTP requests to a specific well-known URI, associating the domain or subdomain with the user's DID.

The protocol's dual identifier system provides both user-friendly identifiers for use in end-user services and consistent cryptographic identities within the protocol, while also providing a robust TCP/IP-based account verification mechanism at the protocol level.

=== User data repositories ===
User data within the protocol is stored in dedicated data repositories, or "repos". Each user is associated with a single repository, over which they have exclusive management rights. Repositories contain mutable collections of user records, which log actions such as posts, likes, follows, and blocks. Records are persistent and can only be added or removed at the explicit request of the user.

Each record within a repository's collection is assigned a unique record key, which is used by network agents to reference records within a user's repository. The current implementation of record keys is the timestamp identifier (TID), derived from the record's creation time. Repositories store collections in a Merkle search tree, which sorts records chronologically based on their TID.

Media files, along with their metadata, size, and media type, are stored separately from repositories as blobs, a type of unstructured binary data, in the user's host server. This allows network agents to access and process arbitrary media files regardless of their original schema or upload context.

Currently all data in repositories is public, but there are plans to add private data to the protocol.

=== Personal Data Servers ===
Personal Data Servers (PDSes) host user repositories and their associated media. They also serve as the network access point for users, facilitating repository updates, backups, data queries, and user requests.

Platform clients access the protocol on the user's behalf by querying their PDS, which, in turn, fetches the requested data from other services within the network. This design differs from ActivityPub, where protocol interactions and services are handled by monolithic host servers. Since network events are resolved through the protocol's network-wide indexing infrastructure, the availability of any single PDS is, by design, potentially inconsequential to the user experience.

The AT Protocol prioritizes data portability, enabling users to back up and migrate repositories and associated media without data loss, even in the event of an adversarial PDS. The design of PDSes within the protocol results in low computational requirements for operation, allowing individuals or groups to run their own PDSes without the need for significant computational resources.

Although most users' repositories reside in PDSes run by Bluesky Social, many independent PDSes exist within the network.

=== Relays and the firehose ===
Relays are a key component of the protocol's indexing infrastructure, serving as the core indexers within the network. Relays crawl the network by continuously fetching repository updates from PDSes before aggregating, indexing, and forwarding these updates into network-wide data streams, collectively called the firehose. The firehose is available to all network agents, and can be consumed by any service within the network. Relays can choose to index all or part of the network.

By eliminating the need to crawl or store user data and providing a unified data stream, relays simplify the development of applications and services in the protocol and reduce their operational costs.

Relays have been criticized as being the most centralized component in the protocol's design, given their near-indispensable role in the network and a lack of clear incentives for running a relay.

=== AppViews ===
AppViews, analogous to current-day social networking services, are end-user platforms and services within the protocol that consume, process, and deliver data from the relay to user clients in response to queries from users' PDSes. They utilize network-wide information from the firehose, such as posts, likes, follows, and replies, to create customized user experiences within their clients.

The design of AppViews within the protocol allows for significant variation in implementation. AppViews can implement invite systems, custom algorithms, alternative clients, varying monetization and content moderation strategies, and off-protocol services. Despite these differences, all AppViews operate from the same data sourced from the firehose. This architecture reduces the computational load and storage requirements of AppViews, and prevents user lock-in by enabling users to easily switch between AppViews while retaining their posts, follows, likes, etc.

The largest AppView on the protocol is currently Bluesky, although other AppViews, such as Blacksky (a project supporting Black social media users), Frontpage (a Hacker News-style social news website) and Smoke Signal (an RSVP management service) are also available within the protocol.

=== Lexicons ===
All records and XRPC calls within the AT Protocol follow a specific global schema language called a lexicon to support different service and platform modalities. AppViews within the protocol have the flexibility to define their own unique lexicons, or utilize existing ones.

This approach allows AppViews to create custom lexicons that are tailored to their specific use case while maintaining compatibility with the broader network. As an example, records displayed in an AppView focused on microblogging would likely use a different lexicon than one focused on video-sharing, as their content types require different sets of attributes.

However, AppViews can also choose to serve content using lexicons defined by other AppViews, even if the content was originally posted elsewhere in the network. For example, a new microblogging AppView could choose to serve previously posted content using the lexicon defined by an established competitor, enabling them to provide novel features and services while maintaining compatibility with existing content.

This schema design is intended to eliminate user lock-in and foster user-centric innovation by forcing AppViews to differentiate themselves through unique user experiences and additional functionality, rather than relying on exclusive access to content.

Lexicons are referenced within records using Namespaced Identifiers (NSIDs), which consist of a domain authority in reverse domain-name order, followed by an arbitrary name segment. For example, com.example.foo is a valid NSID, where com.example is the domain authority, and foo is the name segment.

The most popular record lexicon in the protocol, app.bsky, defines Bluesky's microblogging schema. The com.atproto lexicon for XRPC calls is used for endpoints that should be widely adopted across services and is referenced in the specification.

=== Opinionated services ===
Opinionated services are services within the protocol that process data from the firehose to provide subjective judgements on network data for the purposes of content moderation and curation. These services contrast with the intended "unopinionated" nature of relays. Opinionated services enable users to customize their content consumption and moderation preferences within the protocol while maintaining the relative neutrality of the protocol's core components.

Users have the ability to subscribe and unsubscribe to these services at any time through their client app (unless they are hard-coded into the user's current AppView.) The modularity of these services allows for a customizable, stackable, user-centric approach to content curation and moderation within the protocol.

==== Labelers ====
Labelers produce judgements about user-generated content, such as identifying spam or inappropriate material. These labels can be applied to various aspects of the network, including posts, images, or accounts. The output of labelers is consumed by AppViews and PDSes, which can then provide various strategies to users for handling labeled content, such as hiding, labeling, or blurring.

Bluesky Social has open-sourced its internal labeler moderation service "Ozone", allowing users to create custom moderation services for the network.

Although labelers can be used as moderation services, they can also serve informational or entertainment purposes, such as labeling post topics, user pronouns, or adding positive or playful labels to user profiles and posts.

==== Bluesky feed generators ====
Feed generators process Bluesky posts within the firehose for inclusion in custom Bluesky feeds. After a PDS query, they return a list of post IDs to the user's AppView, which can then be used to create curated feeds. While Bluesky does not provide any built-in tools for generating and hosting custom feeds, services such as Graze provide tools for users to create and host feeds using block coding, as well as to monetize them with injected advertisements.

== History ==
The AT Protocol began development by Bluesky Social PBC, a public benefit corporation originally created as an independent research group within Twitter, Inc. to investigate the possibility of decentralizing the service. The protocol's reference implementation was first released to GitHub on May 4, 2022 under the name Authenticated Data Experiment (ADX), and is licensed under both the MIT and Apache licenses. It rebranded to the AT Protocol in October 2022.

In March 2025, the first AT Protocol-focused conference, ATmosphereConf, was held in Seattle. The conference focused on exploring the AT Protocol's potential beyond the Bluesky social network. Sessions focused on decentralized social networking, identity portability, and interoperability across applications.

In September 2025, the IETF published an Internet Draft for a specification of the AT Protocol's core services. In January 2026, the charter for the working group tasked with the standardization was published.

== Adoption ==
=== Bluesky ===
The AT Protocol has been adopted for use by the Bluesky social network (also developed by Bluesky Social PBC), and is its most popular implementation. The social network itself opened federation with other Personal Data Servers in late February 2024, as it had launched without the ability to federate with other servers not run by Bluesky Social. Additionally, the news aggregator Flipboard allows users to log in with their Bluesky account to view and interact with posts from the service. To aid adoption, Bluesky Social funds, via grants, various projects that use the AT Protocol for federating or creating content, or both. A notable application funded by the grants is a proxy server known as SkyBridge, which can convert API calls from Mastodon apps to their equivalent AT Protocol and Bluesky APIs, allowing users to have access to both networks even without official support.

While the AT Protocol is a separate protocol with no major technical similarities to other protocols, there have been services developed that can bridge content across protocols. An example is the Bridgy Fed software, which can crosspost content between all posts made on the ActivityPub protocol and posts using Bluesky lexicon on the AT Protocol. Posts from Nostr can also be "double-bridged" to the AT Protocol via another bridge that can crosspost notes from Nostr to ActivityPub.

=== Other applications ===
As Bluesky's popularity has grown, the protocol has also received more attention from both independent developers and investors. Most developers have opted to target solely Bluesky's API subset, as it allows for access of its pre-existing content and is faster to develop for. Notable among these are Flashes, a client with similarities to Instagram, and Skylight, a client designed as a short-video platform akin to TikTok, backed by American entrepreneur Mark Cuban after he posted a call to action for developing an alternative to the application on the protocol following the (at the time) impending ban of the app in the United States.

Despite the focus on Bluesky compatibility, there have been apps developed independently from Bluesky's AppView and lexicons, allowing for greater flexibility in what content is allowed. Examples of this include:

- Blacksky, an open-source software infrastructure project that supports Black social media users
- Leaflet, a longform blogging and document application
- Tangled, a Git collaboration application
- Gander Social, a social media service founded and run by Canadians for Canadians which is centred on privacy, data sovereignty, and human-first online interactions
- Streamplace, a live-streaming video platform
- Frontpage, a federated link aggregator
- Skylight, a Tiktok alternative

In May 2026, Automattic released "ATmosphere", a WordPress plugin that integrates the content management system into the AT Protocol. The plugin publishes standard app.bsky.feed.post records for visibility on Bluesky and stores each article as a record using Standard.site lexicons, allowing other AT Protocol applications to independently render the full long-form articles.

=== Standardization via the IETF ===
In August 2025, some portions of the AT Protocol were submitted to the Internet Engineering Task Force as a non-Working Group-forming Birds of a Feather (BOF) proposal, mainly for the purpose of receiving feedback from the IETF community. In September of the same year, Internet Drafts for a written specification of the protocol's repository formats and data synchronization process as well as a general overview of the protocol's architecture were submitted to the IETF.

== See also ==
- Comparison of software and protocols for distributed social networking
- Fediverse
- Secure Scuttlebutt
