= Pixelfed =

Open source photo-sharing platform

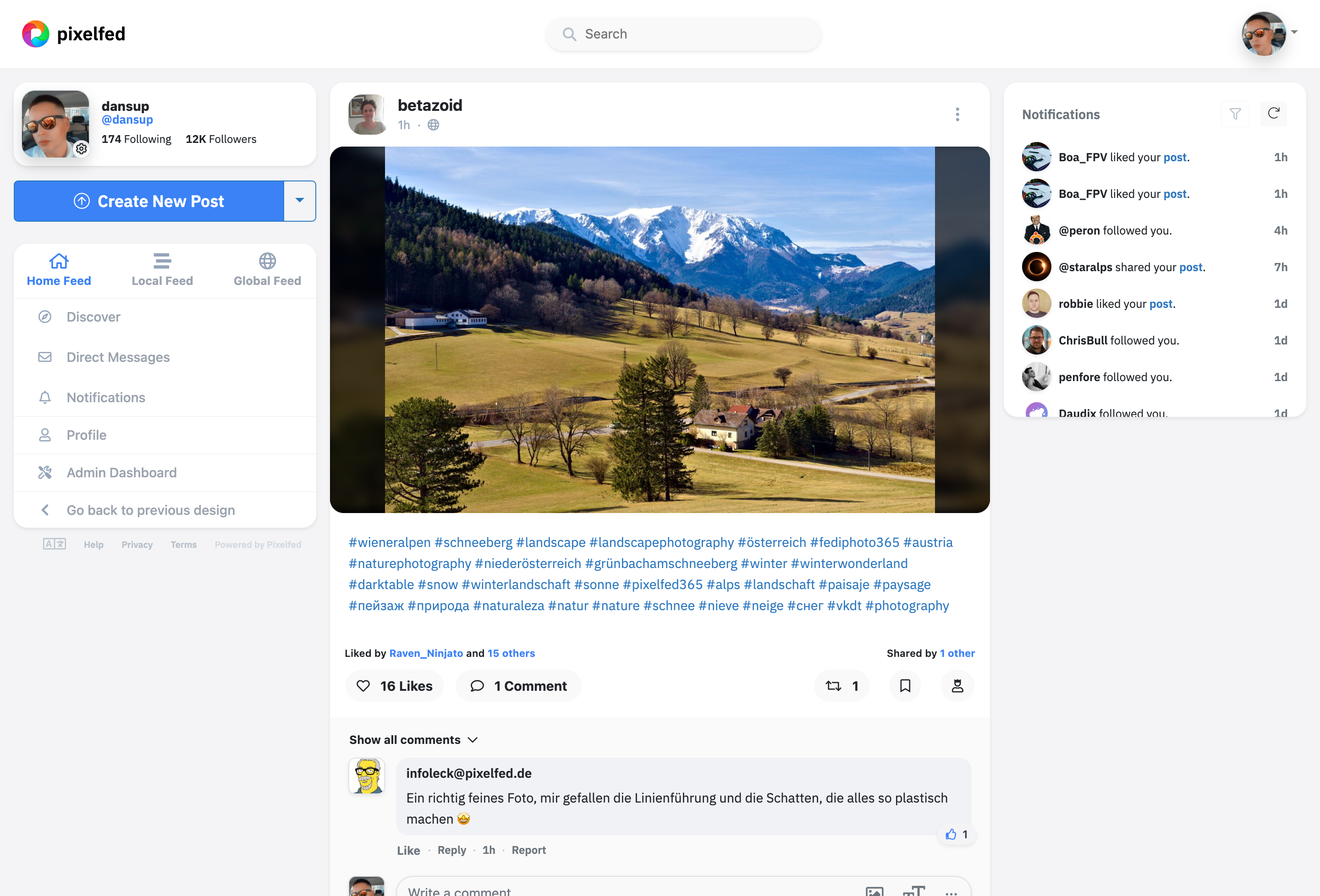
- Screenshot of a Pixelfed page
- Developer: Daniel Supernault
- Release: December 25, 2018; 7 years ago
- Stable release: 0.12.7 / 17 February 2026
- Written in: PHP
- Platform: Web
- Available in: 44 languages
- License: AGPLv3+
- Website: pixelfed.org
- Repository: github.com/pixelfed/pixelfed

Pixelfed is a free and open-source image sharing social network service. The platform uses a decentralized architecture which is roughly comparable to e-mail providers, meaning user data is not stored on one central server. It uses the ActivityPub protocol, allowing users to interact with other social networks within the protocol, such as Mastodon, PeerTube, and Friendica. Pixelfed and other platforms utilizing this protocol are considered to be part of the Fediverse.

Much like Mastodon, Pixelfed implements chronological timelines without content manipulation algorithms. It also aims to be privacy-focused with no third-party analytics or tracking. Pixelfed optionally organizes its media by hashtags, geo-tagging and likes based on each server. It also allows audiences to be distinguished in three ways and on a post-by-post basis: followers-only, public, and unlisted. Like several other social platforms, Pixelfed allows accounts to be locked, so that followers must be pre-approved by the owner.

== Features ==
Pixelfed has photo sharing features similar to Instagram and is sometimes considered an ethical alternative to Instagram. Users can post photos, stories, and collections via an independent, distributed, and federating photo community in the form of connected Pixelfed instances. Posts made in the same Pixelfed instance as the user will appear on Local Feed, while posts from other Fediverse instances will be available on Global Feed. The Home Feed, however, will show posts of followed users. The discover page displays images that may be of interest to users.

Each post allows for a maximum of 10 photos or videos attached. Pixelfed shares some of Mastodon's features, including an emphasis on discovery feeds and content warnings.

Official and third-party apps for both Android and iOS are available; the official apps launched in January 2025.

== Subsidiary projects ==
=== Loops ===
Loops
- Developer: Daniel Supernault
- Release: October 25, 2024; 21 months ago
- Stable release: v1.0.0 - beta.4 / 2025-11-04
- Written in: PHP, Vue.js
- Platform: Web
- License: AGPLv3+
- Website: joinloops.org
- Repository: github.com/joinLoops

Loops is a social network software with a goal to bring TikTok-style shortform videos to the Fediverse. The premiere instance started sign-ups in October 2024. It is operated under the Pixelfed project. A moderation system called 'Trust Score' is to be used in the beta stage. Users can post videos that are up to 60 seconds long.

Loops is funded by NGI0 core grant, sponsors, and donations.

== Security ==
Pixelfed supports two-factor authentication via time-based one-time password mobile apps.

== Reception ==
NLnet argued in 2020 that the tools and features of Pixelfed make it a "more attractive (and ethical) alternative" to Instagram.

In December 2022, John Voorhees wrote a detailed review of using Pixelfed on iOS, and said "Pixelfed is sort of like a decentralized version of Instagram that has adopted the ActivityPub protocol."

In February 2023, in a detailed review of whether to leave Facebook, Twitter and Instagram for the fediverse, Andrew C. Oliver, columnist for InfoWorld, wrote "Mastodon and Pixelfed feel safer than their non-federated counterparts" and said Pixelfed is the fediverse answer to Instagram. Oliver also said it is early days "in the Pixelfediverse", and that content is more sparse but is either more interesting or at least not manipulative. Charlie Sorrel of Lifewire said Pixelfed shows the flexibility of Mastodon, and has the potential to be much better than Twitter because of ActivityPub.

Using Pixelfed has been discussed in books and conference proceedings.

In January 2025, 404 Media reported that Meta was blocking posts on Facebook containing links to Pixelfed and 404 Media's stories about Meta's blocking. Additionally, it was reported that Meta was also blocking 404 Media's stories about the censorship.

== See also ==
- Distributed social network
- Comparison of software and protocols for distributed social networking
