= Misskey =

Open source, federated, social networking service

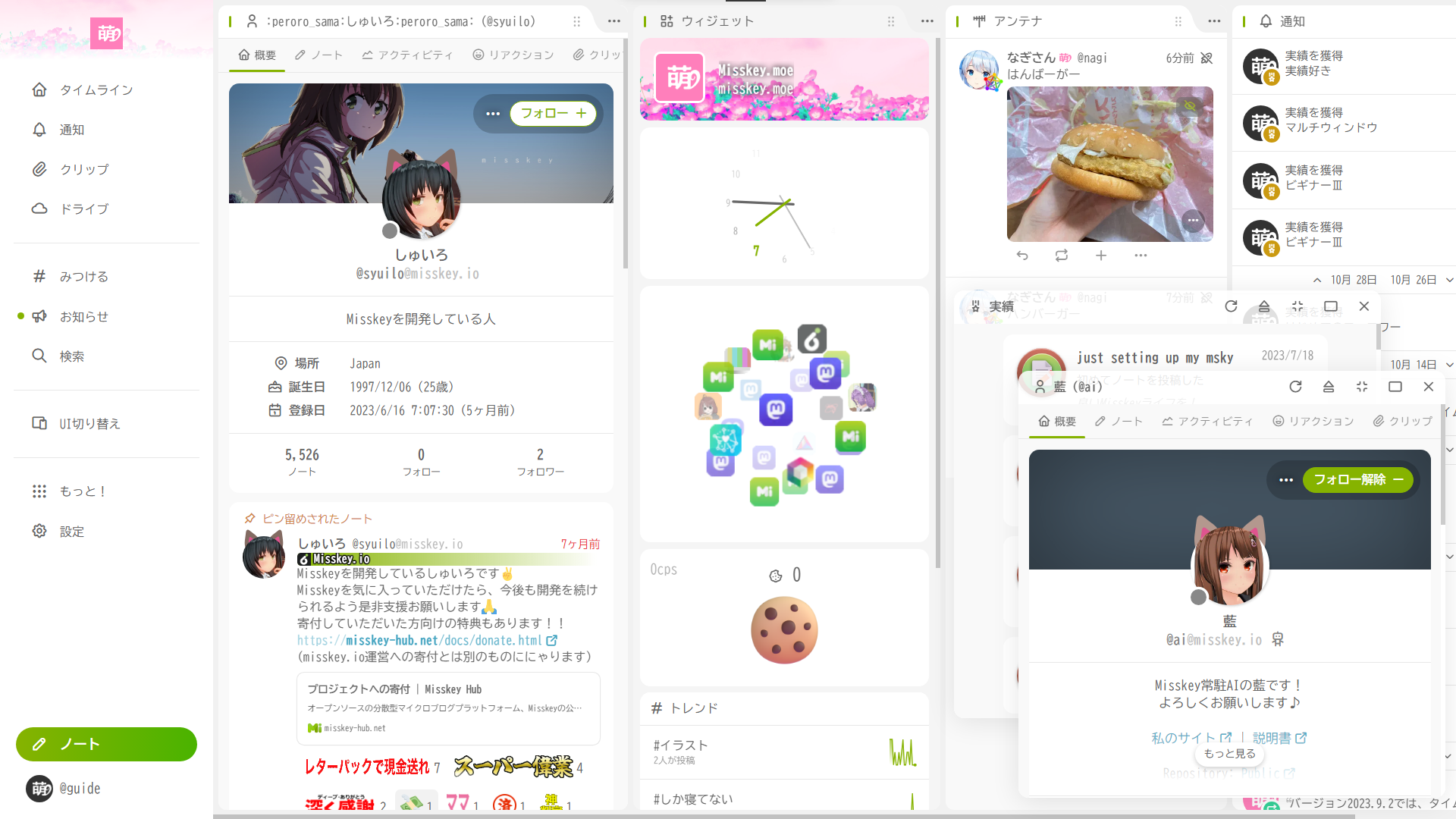
- Original author: syuilo
- Release: 2014; 12 years ago
- Stable release: 2024.10.1 / October 15, 2024 (Note: If the exact release date isn't shown on GitHub, check the archived version of the page.)
- Written in: TypeScript
- Operating system: Cross-platform
- Available in: 28 languages
- Type: Microblogging
- License: GNU Affero General Public License 3.0
- Website: misskey-hub.net
- Repository: github.com/misskey-dev/misskey

Misskey (Note: Japanese: ミスキー, romanized: Misukī) is an open source, federated, social networking service created in 2014 by Japanese software engineer Eiji "syuilo" Shinoda. Misskey uses the ActivityPub protocol for federation, allowing users to interact between independent Misskey instances, and other ActivityPub compatible platforms such as Mastodon and Wordpress. Misskey is generally considered to be part of the Fediverse.

Despite being a decentralized service, Misskey is not philosophically opposed to centralization. The name Misskey comes from the lyrics of Brain Diver, a song by the Japanese singer May'n.

== History ==
Misskey was initially developed as a BBS-style internet forum by high school student Eiji Shinoda in 2014. In 2018, Misskey added support for ActivityPub, becoming a federated social media platform.

The flagship Misskey server, Misskey.io, was started on April 15, 2019.

Misskey, alongside Mastodon and Bluesky, has received attention as a potential replacement for Twitter following Twitter's acquisition by Elon Musk in 2022.

On April 8, 2023, Misskey.io incorporated as MisskeyHQ K.K. As of February 2024, over 450,000 users were registered, making it the largest instance of Misskey. Misskey.io is crowdfunded. The administrator of Misskey.io is Japanese system administrator Yoshiki Eto, who operates under the alias Murakami-san. Eiji Shinoda serves as director.

In July 2023, Twitter introduced extreme restrictions on their API in order to combat scraping from bots. Some users were critical of the changes, and as a result migrated to other social networks. The number of users registering on Misskey.io, Misskey's official instance and the largest one, increased rapidly, with other Misskey instances also receiving a spike in signups. In response to this trend, Skeb, a platform for sharing art, announced on July 14, 2023 that it would sponsor the Misskey development team.

In early 2024, Misskey was targeted by a spam attack from Japan. The cause of the attack is believed to be a dispute between rival groups on a Japanese hacker forum and a DDoS attack on a Discord bot. Mastodon instances with open registration were used in the attack.

In November 2025, Eto announced intentions to replace ActivityPub with Misskey's own low-overhead federation system in "a few years". Shinoda later said that this was "fake news".

== Development ==
Misskey is open source software and is licensed under the AGPLv3. The Misskey API is publicly available and is documented using the OpenAPI Specification, which allows users to build automated accounts and use it on any Misskey instance. The service is translated using Crowdin.

Misskey is developed using Node.js. TypeScript is used on both the frontend and backend. PostgreSQL is used as its database. Vue.js is used for the frontend.

== Functionality ==
Posts on Misskey are called "notes". Notes are limited to a maximum of 3,000 characters (a limit which can be customized by instances), and can be accompanied by any file, including polls, images, videos, and audio. Notes can be reposted, either by themselves or with another "quote" note.

Misskey comes with multiple timelines to sort through the notes that an instance has available, and are displayed in reverse chronological order. The Home timeline shows notes from users that you follow, the Local timeline shows all notes from the instance in use, the Social timeline shows both the Home and Local timeline, and the Global timeline shows every public note that the instance knows about.

Notes have customizable privacy settings to control what users can see a note, similar to Mastodon's post visibility ranges. Public notes show up on all timelines, while Home notes only show on a user's Home timeline. Notes can also be set to be available only for followers. Direct messages using notes can be sent to users.

== Third-party clients ==
Third-party clients that support Misskey include Milktea for Android and MissCat for iOS.

Misskey does not officially provide an app for iOS or Android, and recommends users to add their instance's included progressive web app to their mobile devices.

== Forks ==
Misskey's open source nature has led to the development of a number of forks:

- Firefish (formerly Calckey) has been developed by ThatOneCalculator since 2022. Firefish includes enhanced compatibility with the Mastodon API. Further development of the project is discontinued due to a lack of maintainers and code quality issues, as well as the sudden disappearance of ThatOneCalculator.
- Foundkey was primarily developed by Johann155, a contributor to Misskey. The fork was started as a result of various language barriers in regards to Misskey's development, as a result of an overwhelming amount of it being conducted exclusively in Japanese. Development is currently paused, and it has been advised to not use Foundkey with more than 20 users.
- Iceshrimp, forked from Firefish in 2023. The project is currently in the process of being rewritten into C# and .NET.
- Sharkey, developed by Transfem.org. Main features include note editing, local-only notes and compatibility with the Mastodon API.
- Catodon, a fork of Misskey. Main singular features include federated forums and blogs, RSS feed timeline, customizable timelines, and native Mastodon API compatibility.

== See also ==
- ActivityPub
- Comparison of microblogging and similar services
- Comparison of software and protocols for distributed social networking
- Fediverse
- Mastodon
- Pleroma
