= OpenAutonomy =

Social networking protocol

- Original author(s): Jeff Disher
- Developer(s): Open Autonomy Inc.
- Stable release: r518 (reference implementation) / 2015-01-19
- Written in: PHP (reference implementation)
- Type: Social network service
- License: MIT License (reference implementation)
- Website: openautonomy.com

OpenAutonomy is a protocol facilitating decentralized social networking and other web services. The design of the system allows users to interoperate across different internet servers and domains with no central mediating authority. Further, each user can also possess application instances running on different internet servers and domains yet still interacting with each other across these boundaries.

The intent of the technology and its users is to build a distributed, federated, extensible web platform to compete with the current "walled garden" approach. The idea is to break the boundaries between services/servers and web/native and allowing everything to inter-operate with an emphasis on: extensibility, innovation, privacy, and freedom.

== Applications and use cases ==
OpenAutonomy currently has innate applications which lend themselves to several use-cases where users are in full control of their content with the use of trust groups: a social networking application, an event application which is used to announce events and add photos from those events which can then be shared, a personal cloud storage location with the option of file collaboration, a messaging system to message other users and the ability to add personal and general RSS feeds catering to a user's own interests from anywhere on the web for a user's own as well as potentially collaborative shared use.

As the OpenAutonomy user base is distributed across multiple internet domains, a federated login system is provided to allow these users to interact as first-class entities on any OpenAutonomy server.

Anyone can run an OpenAutonomy server or extend the capabilities of existing servers and applications by defining their own application protocols.

As of February 9, 2020, the hyperlink to the website redirects to a DNS sales company.

== See also ==
- Comparison of software and protocols for distributed social networking
