= Blacksky =

Social media made as an alternative to Black Twitter

- Blacksky logo since October 2025
- Website type: Digital public infrastructure
- CEO: Rudy Fraser
- Services: Alternative stack for the AT Protocol
- Website: blacksky.community [Application] blackskyweb.xyz [Marketing] blacksky.app [PDS] atproto.africa [Relay]
- Launched: June 19, 2023
- Current status: Active

Blacksky is a social network developed and maintained by Blacksky Algorithms, which provides curated feeds and moderation tools to support Black social media users, many of whom previously used Black Twitter.

Blacksky runs an alternative implementation of Bluesky's AT Protocol using a self-built stack in the Rust programming language named "rsky", and is optionally independent from (but interoperates with) the infrastructure run by Bluesky and other hosts on the protocol's network. Technologist Rudy Fraser started the project in 2021 and launched it in 2023. As of 2024, it was operated by a team of six moderators.

On July 29, 2026 Blacksky Algorithms announced that the public beta of Blacksky was open and that beta apps for iOS and Android were available on Apple TestFlight and the Google Play Store (respectively) with a post on Bluesky.
