= Comparison of software and protocols for federated social networking =

The following is a comparison of both software and protocols that are used for federated social networking.

== Software ==
=== Active ===
| Project Name | Features | Software type | Programming Language | License | Privacy features, if any | Federation capabilities | Instance count | Current status |
|---|---|---|---|---|---|---|---|---|
| Bluesky | Microblogging | Client | TypeScript | MIT | None (planned) | AT Protocol (Personal Data Server, opinionated services) | 2 AppViews, multiple Relays, 1640 PDSes | Active |
| diaspora* | Status messages, blogging, image sharing | Client/server | Ruby | AGPLv3 | Post reach can be controlled via "aspects" | diaspora* network | 61 (January 2025) | Active |
| Friendica | Rich profiles, networking groups, community/group/celebrity pages, richtext status (not specifically length limited), photo albums, YouTube share, location, like/dislike, multiple profiles w/assignment to specific friends, single sign-on to post directly to friend's profiles on co-operating systems. Communications encryption. Fans and one-way relationships. Local and global directory services. Ability to restrict connection endpoints. | Client/server | PHP, JavaScript | AGPLv3 | Access controls for content, disappearing messages, private groups | ActivityPub, DFRN, diaspora* network, Email, RSS, third-party connections (Tumblr, Twitter, more via plugins) | 345 (January 2025) | Active |
| Lemmy | Social news | Client/server | Rust | AGPLv3 | None | ActivityPub | 576 (January 2025) | Active |
| Libervia | Microblogging, group microblogging, file sharing, games, XMPP client | Client/server | Python, C++ | AGPLv3 | Presence authorization, XMPP groups | XMPP, ActivityPub in beta as of 2022. | Demo | Active |
| Mastodon | Microblogging | Client/server | Ruby, JavaScript | AGPLv3 | Access controls for content | ActivityPub | 10156 (January 2025) | Active |
| Micro.blog | Microblogging | Client | Unknown | Proprietary | Access controls for content | ActivityPub, AT Protocol (Bluesky crossposting) | 1 | Active |
| Minds | Microblogging | Client/server | PHP | AGPLv3 | None | ActivityPub | 1 | Active |
| Misskey | Microblogging | Client/server | TypeScript | AGPLv3 | Access controls for content | ActivityPub | 1244 (January 2025) | Active |
| Mobilizon | Events, groups, shared folders | Client/server | Elixir | AGPLv3 | Access controls for content | ActivityPub | 106 (January 2025) | Active |
| Movim | XMPP client, news aggregation | Client/server | PHP | AGPLv3 | Access controls for content, end-to-end encryption for chats | XMPP | 16 (January 2025) | Active |
| PeerTube | Video sharing | Client/server | TypeScript | AGPLv3 | Access controls for content | ActivityPub | 1302 (January 2025) | Active |
| Pixelfed | Image sharing, similar to Instagram | Client/server | PHP | AGPLv3 | Access controls for content | ActivityPub | 543 (January 2025) | Active |
| Pleroma | Instant messaging, microblogging | Client/server | Elixir | AGPLv3 | Access controls for content | ActivityPub | 1020 (January 2025) | Active |

=== Inactive ===
| Project Name | Features | Software type | Programming Language | License | Privacy features, if any | Federation capabilities | Current status |
|---|---|---|---|---|---|---|---|
| GNU social | Primarily microblogging, groups | Client/server | PHP | AGPLv3 | Access controls for content | ActivityPub (via plugin), OStatus | Stable, last update to both supported major versions circa 2022 |
| Kune | real-time collaborative edition, XMPP chat, groups, calendar, lists, tasks, blogs, Apache Wave inbox (modern email), wave extensions (gadgets, robots), public webpages, profiles, galleries (photos, videos), maps, federation, usability | Client/server | Java | AGPLv3 | Access controls for content | XMPP, Wave Federation Protocol | Stable, last updated 2017 |
| pump.io | Microblogging | Client/server | Node.js, JavaScript | Apache 2.0 | Access controls for content | ActivityPump | Stable, inactive |

== Protocols ==
=== Active ===
| Project Name | Features | License | Privacy features, if any | Supported apps | Instance count | Current status |
|---|---|---|---|---|---|---|
| ActivityPub | Activity Streams, WebFinger | Released as a W3C standard | Inbox/outbox access controls | Many | >42,000 | Active |
| ActivityPump | Activity Streams, WebFinger | AGPLv3 | Inbox/outbox access controls | Pump.io | | Inactive, network still online |
| AT Protocol | Modular, microservice-oriented protocol architecture | Dual (MIT, Apache 2.0) | None (planned) | Bluesky | ~2.4k data servers, few servers for other parts of the protocol (January 2025) | Active |
| diaspora* network | Status messages, blogging, photo sharing | AGPLv3 | Post reach can be controlled via "aspects" | diaspora* (social network) | 61 (January 2025) | Active |
| FOAF | User relationships | CC BY 1.0 | None | | | Active |
| Nostr | Extensible, based on event objects | Public domain | None | Many | Hundreds of relays | Active, stable |
| OStatus | OAuth 2, WebFinger, PubSubHubbub, Salmon | AGPLv3 | None | GNU social, StatusNet | Less than 100 | Inactive, network still online |
| Twister | Peer-to-peer microblogging | MIT and BSD | End-to-end encryption for private messages | Twister | Unknown | Inactive, network still online |
| XMPP | Microblogging | Varied, based on implementation | Access controls, presence authorization, encryption | Many | Many | Active, stable |

=== Inactive ===
| Project Name | Features | License | Privacy features, if any | Current status |
|---|---|---|---|---|
| Distributed Social Networking Protocol | DSNPd (server daemon), ChoiceSocial (web interface) | | | beta (v0.6) |
| Mr. Privacy | Email social network | | Private messaging | Dead |
| OpenAutonomy | Micro-blogging, RSS aggregation, Cloud storage | MIT | Trusted user list and fine-grained trusted sub-groups | stable (r210) (updated: 2015) |
| OpenMicroBlogging | Microblogging | AGPLv3 | None | Dead |
| Secure Scuttlebutt | social networking, messaging, games, development tools | Various FLOSS licenses | End-to-end encryption for private messages. | Stable |
| SONIC | Federation protocol for OSN services | MIT | | beta (updated: 2018) |

== See also ==
- Comparison of instant messaging protocols
