= Lemmy (social network) =

Open source social media software

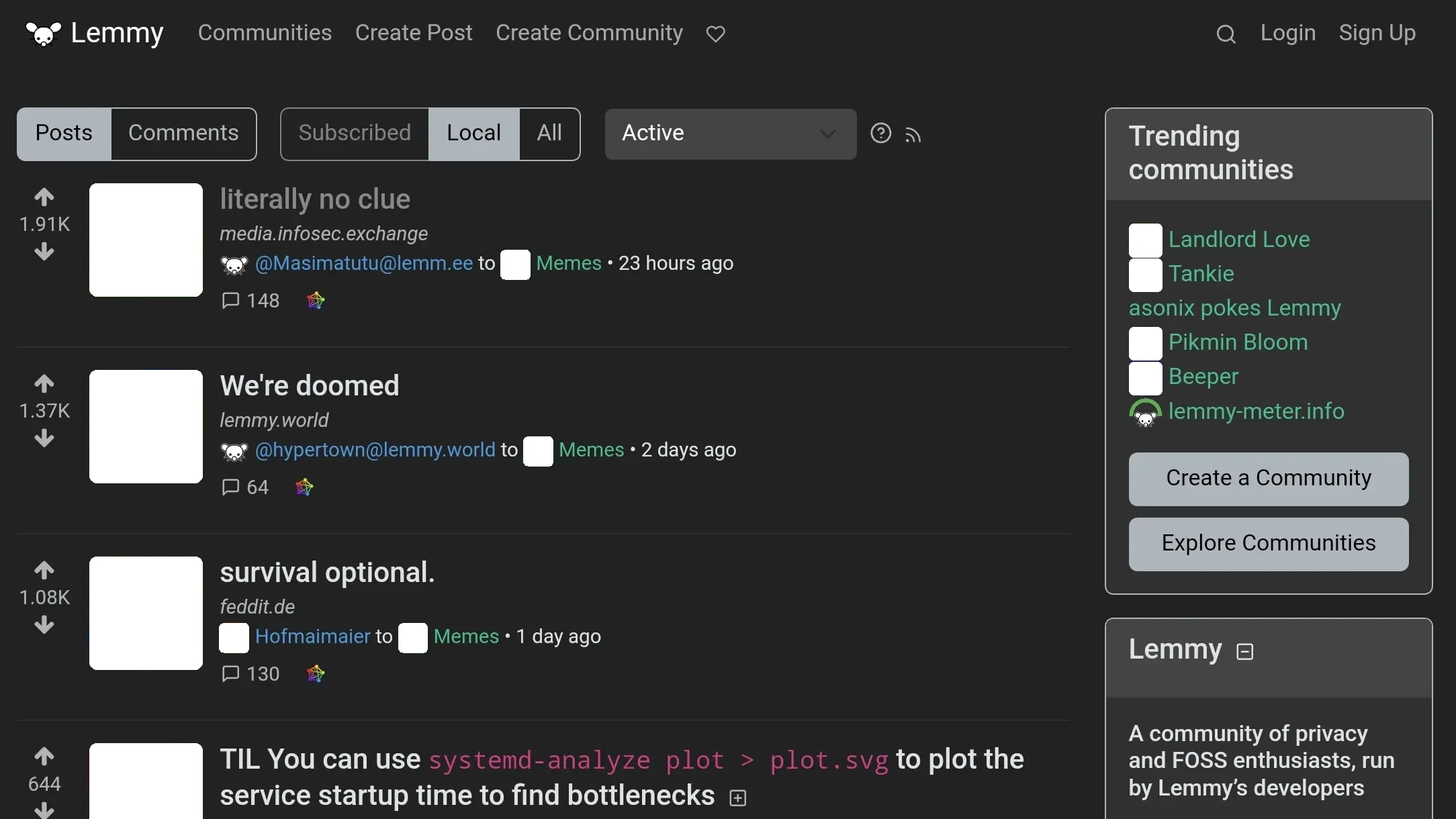
- A screenshot of Lemmy.ml, a Lemmy instance (thumbnails removed for copyright reasons).
- Developer: LemmyNet
- Release: May 5, 2019; 7 years ago
- Stable release: 0.19.21 / 26 October 2026
- Written in: Rust, TypeScript
- Type: Social news
- License: AGPLv3
- Website: join-lemmy.org
- Repository: github.com/LemmyNet/lemmy

Lemmy is a free and open-source, social news aggregation software for running self-hosted discussion forums. These hosts, known as "instances", communicate with each other using the ActivityPub protocol.

== History ==
Lemmy was created by the user Dessalines on GitHub in February 2019 and licensed under the Affero General Public License.

In a 2020 post, Lemmy's co-creator Dessalines wrote about the origin of the name Lemmy. "It was nameless for a long time, but I wanted to keep with the fediverse tradition of naming projects after animals. I was playing that old-school game Lemmings, and Lemmy (from Motorhead) had passed away that week, and we held a few polls for names, and I went with that."

According to the Fediverse statistics sites the-federation.info and fedidb.com, Lemmy had fewer than 100 instances prior to June 2023, but grew to 455 instances with approximately 48,600 monthly active users as of 22 December 2025, with the largest instances being lemmy.world and lemmy.ml, reporting about 14,144 and 1,982 monthly active users, respectively.

== Description ==
Lemmy is made up of a network of individual installations of the Lemmy software that can intercommunicate. This departs from the centralized, monolithic structure of other social media platforms. It has been described as a federated alternative to Reddit.

Users on individual instances submit posts with links, text, or pictures to user-created forums for discussion called "communities". Discussion is in the form of threaded comments. Posts and comments can be upvoted or downvoted though the ability to downvote can be disabled by the admins of each instance.

Communities are local to each instance, however users may subscribe to communities, create posts and leave comments across instances. Moderation is conducted by the administrators of each instance and moderators of specific communities. Community names begin with c/ in the URL (e.g lemmy.ml/c/simpleliving) and are mentionable using the !community@instance format.

On each instance, a front page presents the user with popular posts from several communities. These posts can then be filtered according to origin: posts from the instance the user is on, or from all federated instances. It can also be made to only show posts from communities the user has subscribed to.

Lemmy instances are generally supported by donations.

== Relations with other social networks ==
ActivityPub is the protocol used to allow Lemmy instances to operate as a federated social network. It allows users to interact with compatible platforms such as Kbin and Mastodon.

In June 2023, following the announcement of Reddit API service changes intended to reduce the use of third-party Reddit clients, community members discussed relocating to Lemmy and other Reddit competitors. Reddit banned a user for promoting switching to Lemmy along with the r/LemmyMigration subreddit as a whole, leading to a Streisand effect after it garnered attention on sites like Hacker News. The ban was reversed a day later.

== Third-party software ==
Prominent third-party Reddit clients Sync and Boost which had shut down due to changes to the pricing of Reddit's API began working on Lemmy clients, with them later relaunching as Sync for Lemmy and Boost for Lemmy.

Multiple other apps and browser clients have also been developed.
