= Distributed social network =

Collection of services that communicate through a common protocol

A distributed social network (not to be confused with a federated social network) is a network wherein all participating social networking services can communicate with each other through a unified communication protocol, and all participants are equal. Users that reside on a compatible service can interact with any user from any compatible service without having to log on to the origin's website. From a societal perspective, one may compare this concept to that of social media being a public utility. Federated social networks contrast with social network aggregation services, which are used to manage accounts and activities across multiple discrete social networks that cannot communicate with each other. A popular example for a federated social network is the fediverse, with more niche examples such as IndieWeb complementing the network.

Services that want to natively connect into a federated social network need to be interoperable with both the majority of content that the network produces (either through converting the content into the service's native format or by adding the ability to read the content in its intended presentation) and the common protocol that the services use. The protocols that are used for federated social networking are generally portable and independent of a service's architecture so it can be easily adopted across various services without requiring a refactoring of its design to accommodate the network, although platforms that do incorporate support for a federated network typically do so to improve the user experience and make the network's effects more clear for users.

A few social networking service providers have used the term more broadly to describe provider-specific services which can be installed across different websites, typically through added widgets or plugins. Through the add-ons, the social network functionality is redirected to the users' social networking service.

== History ==
The Electronic Frontier Foundation (EFF), a US legal defense organization and advocacy group for civil liberties on the Internet, endorses the distributed social network model as one "that can plausibly return control and choice to the hands of the Internet user" and allow persons living under restrictive regimes to "conduct activism on social networking sites while also having a choice of services and providers that may be better equipped to protect their security and anonymity".

The World Wide Web Consortium (W3C), the main international standards organization for the World Wide Web, launched a new Social Activity in July 2014 to develop standards for social web application interoperability.

In 2013, the Open Mobile Alliance (OMA) released a candidate version of the Social Network Web enabler (SNeW) that was approved in 2016. Its specification is based mainly on OStatus and OpenSocial specifications and designed to meet GDPR recommendations. It is a tentative of the telco industry to establish a operated-led federation of social network services.

== Differences between distributed and federated networks ==
Both kinds of networks are decentralized. However, distribution goes further than federation. A federated network has multiple centers, whereas a distributed network has no center at all.

== Active projects ==
While early federated social networking projects traditionally developed a protocol along with their software to fit the needs of the desired architecture, modern projects use a protocol and network that already exists to accelerate adoption of their platform by allowing existing users of other services to migrate seamlessly to the new project. Software that is developed for such networks are almost always free and open-source software, with the protocols in use being open standards that do not charge royalty fees for actions that are taken on the network.

Various open standards that are used to provide a complete network include OAuth for authenticating users and managing their sessions, the ActivityPub protocol for federating content between services, WebFinger for discovering profiles and content on the network, as well as various standards for metadata such as Microformats, Open Graph and others. While this combination of technologies are most associated with the concept of a federated social network and are universal among these networks, the federation protocol has been a major source on controversy regarding the ideal architecture for transmitting content. While ActivityPub (and its predecessors OStatus and ActivityPump) have been used by most services when implementing support for a federated social network, alternatives have been created over the years that attempt to fix perceived issues with the current stack of standards. The most successful of these alternatives has been the AT Protocol, an open standard created by Bluesky that has been built to solve various portability, discovery and content format issues that have arisen with the adoption of ActivityPub among a variety of social networking services. As of March 2026, Bluesky has over 43 million registered global users. A more experimental protocol that has built its own networking stack is Nostr, which has been designed to be simple for implementors to build as it has no dependencies on any existing standards. The protocol has gained some traction among newer SNSes, particularly within the cryptocurrency community.

While many of these standards have been in use for both early and modern projects, some older projects typically used standards such as OStatus, XRDS, Portable Contacts, the Wave Federation Protocol, XMPP, OpenSocial, microformats like XFN and hCard, and Atom web feeds. Some of these standards were referred to as the Open Stack, due to their status as open standards.

== See also ==
- ActivityPub
- AT Protocol
- Comparison of software and protocols for distributed social networking
- Fediverse
- Nostr
