= Mastodon (social network) =

Open source social media service

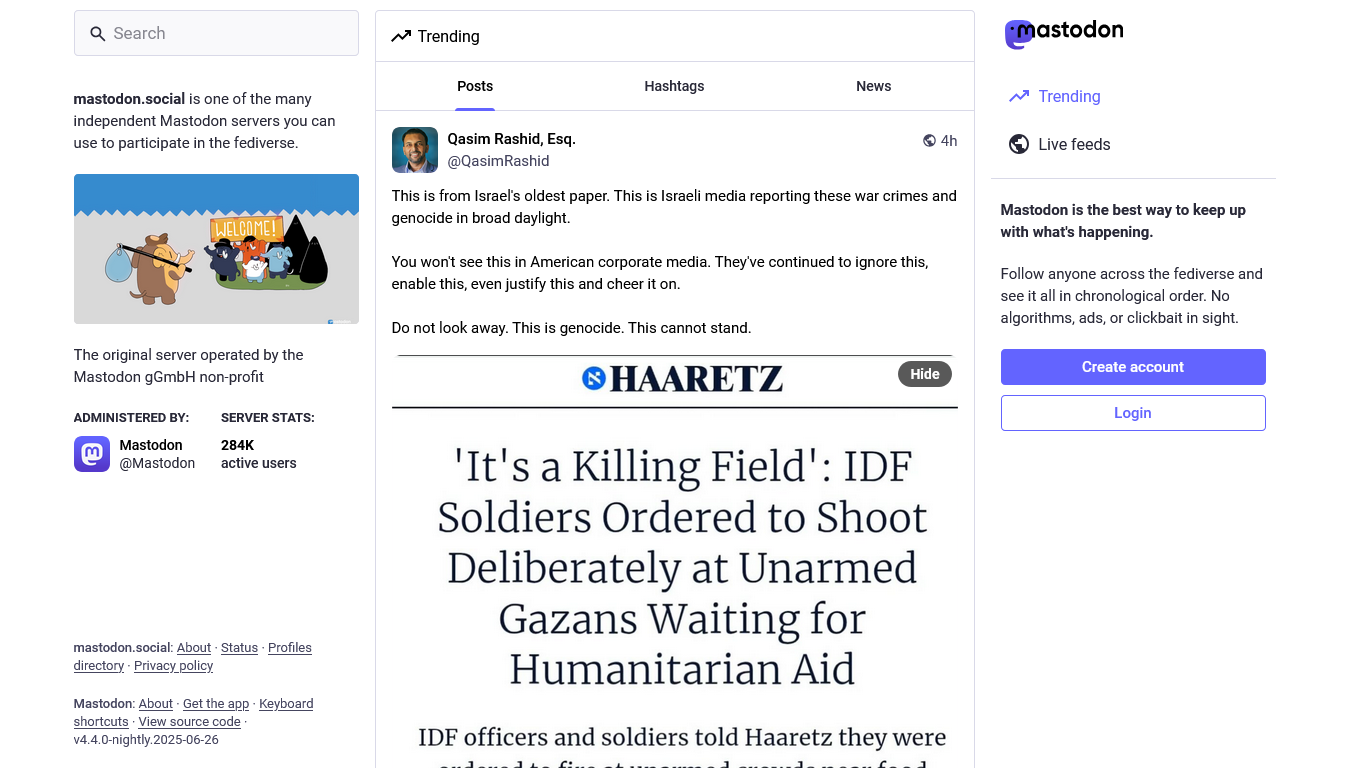
- Trending page as of June 2025
- Original author: Eugen Rochko
- Developer: Mastodon gGmbH
- Release: 16 March 2016; 10 years ago

Stable release(s)
- 4.7.5 / 3 November 2026; 14 days ago

Preview release(s)
- 4.4.0-rc1 / 1 July 2025; 16 months ago
- Written in: Ruby on Rails, JavaScript (React.js, Redux)
- Operating system: Cross-platform
- Platform: iOS, Android, Linux, BSD, macOS, Microsoft Windows
- Standard: ActivityPub
- Available in: 93 languages
- Type: Microblogging
- License: AGPLv3 or later
- Website: joinmastodon.org
- Repository: github.com/mastodon/mastodon

The mascot of the Mastodon social network

Mastodon is a free and open-source software platform for decentralized social networking with microblogging features similar to Twitter. It operates as a federated network of independently managed servers that communicate using the ActivityPub protocol, allowing users to connect across different instances within the Fediverse. Each Mastodon instance establishes its own moderation policies and content guidelines, distinguishing it from centrally controlled social media platforms.

First released in 2016 by Eugen Rochko, Mastodon has positioned itself as an alternative to mainstream social media, particularly for users seeking decentralized, community-driven spaces. The platform has experienced multiple surges in adoption, most notably following Twitter's acquisition by Elon Musk in 2022. It is part of a broader shift toward decentralized social networks, including Bluesky and Lemmy.

Mastodon emphasizes user privacy and moderation flexibility, offering features such as granular post visibility controls, content warning options, and local community-driven moderation. The software is written in Ruby on Rails and Node.js, with a web interface built using React and Redux. It is interoperable with other ActivityPub-based platforms, such as Threads, and supports various third-party applications on desktop and mobile devices.

== Functionality ==
Users post short-form status messages, historically known as "toots", for others to see and interact with.

On a standard Mastodon instance, these messages can include up to 500 text-based characters, greater than Twitter's 280-character limit. Some instances support even longer messages. Images, audio files, videos or polls can also be added to a message.

Users join a specific Mastodon server, rather than a single centralized website or application. The servers are connected as nodes in a network, and each server can administer its own rules, account privileges, and whether to share messages to and from other servers. Users can communicate and follow each other across connected Mastodon servers with usernames similar in format to full email addresses.

Since version 2.9.0, Mastodon's web user interface has offered a single-column mode for new users by default. In advanced mode, the interface approximates the microblogging interface of TweetDeck.

=== Privacy ===
Mastodon includes a number of specific privacy features. Each message has a variety of privacy options available, and users can choose whether the message is public or private.

Messages can display public on a global feed, known as a timeline, or can be shared only to the user's followers. Messages can also be marked as unlisted from timelines or direct between users. Users can also mark their accounts as completely private.

In the timeline, messages can display with an optional content warning feature, which requires readers to click on the hidden main body of the message to reveal it.

Mastodon servers have used this feature to hide spoilers, trigger warnings, and not safe for work (NSFW) content, though some accounts use the feature to hide links and thoughts others might not want to read.

Mastodon aggregates messages in local and federated timelines in real time. The local timeline shows messages from users on a singular server, while the federated timeline shows messages across all participating Mastodon servers.

=== Content moderation ===
In early 2017, journalists like Sarah Jeong distinguished Mastodon from Twitter for its approach to combating harassment. Users can also block others or report them to administrators, much like on X. However, it also features community-based moderation, in which each server can limit or filter out undesirable types of content.

The founder of Mastodon, Eugen Rochko, believes that small, closely related communities deal with unwanted behavior more effectively than a large company's small safety team.

In Move Slowly and Build Bridges, Robert W. Gehl argues that predominantly white participation has shaped Mastodon in ways that affect how reports of racism are received and limit its ability to replicate Black Twitter.

Instance administrators can block other instances from interacting with their own, an action called defederation. By posting toots hashtagged with #fediblock, some instance administrators and users alert others of issues requiring moderation.

=== Searching ===
Mastodon by default allows searching for hashtags and mentioned accounts in the Fediverse. Server administrators can optionally enable Elasticsearch to search the full-text of public posts that have opted in to being indexed.

== Versions ==
In September 2018, with the release of version 2.5 with redesigned public profile pages, Mastodon marked its 100th release.

Mastodon 2.6 was released in October 2018, introducing the possibilities of verified profiles and live, in-stream link previews for images and videos.

Version 2.7, in January 2019, made it possible to search for multiple hashtags at once, instead of searching for just a single hashtag, with more robust moderation capabilities for server administrators and moderators, while accessibility, such as contrast for users with sight issues, was improved.

The ability for users to create and vote in polls, as well as a new invitation system to manage registrations was integrated in April 2019.

Mastodon 2.8.1, released in May 2019, made images with content warnings blurred instead of completely hidden.

In version 2.9 in June 2019, an optional single-column view was added. This view became the default displayed to new users, with a user "preferences" option to switch to a multiple-column-based view.

In August 2020, Mastodon 3.2 was released. It included a redesigned audio player with custom thumbnails and the ability to add personal notes to one's profile.

In July 2021, an official client for iOS devices was released. According to the project's then CEO, Eugen Rochko, the release was part of an effort to attract new users.

Mastodon 4.0 was released in November 2022, including language support for translating posts, editing posts and following hashtags.

Mastodon 4.5 was released in November 2025. Among other features it introduced quote posts, which were previously rejected from being implemented due to concerns about toxicity and harassment. To mitigate these issues Mastodon's quote post feature has been designed in a way that lets users decide if and by whom their posts can be quoted.

== Software ==
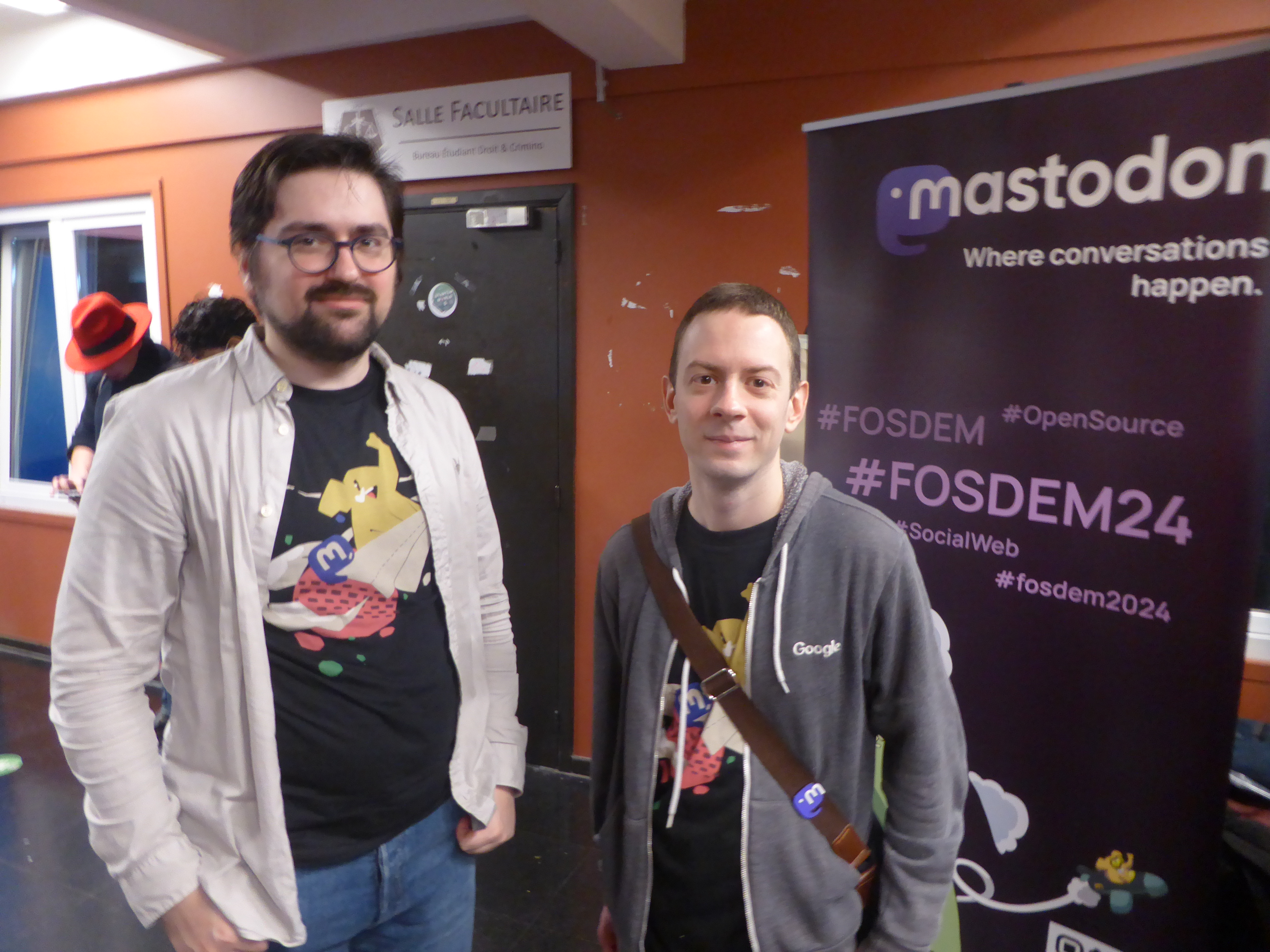
Eugen Rochko with a Mastodon developer at the Mastodon booth at FOSDEM 2024

Mastodon is published as free and open-source software under the Affero GPL license, allowing anyone to use the software or modify it as they wish.

Servers can be run by any individual or organization, and users can join these servers as they wish.

The server software itself is powered by Ruby on Rails and Node.js, with its web client being written in React.js and Redux.

The only database software supported is PostgreSQL, with Redis being used for job processing and various actions that Mastodon needs to process.

The service is interoperable with the fediverse, a collection of social networking services which use the ActivityPub protocol for communication between each other, with previous versions containing support for OStatus.

Client apps for interacting with the Mastodon API are available for desktop computer operating systems, including Windows, macOS and the Linux family of operating systems, as well as mobile phones running iOS and Android. The API is open for anyone to utilize, allowing clients to be built for any operating system that can connect to the Internet.

=== Integration with Fediverse ===
Mastodon uses the ActivityPub protocol for federation; this allows users to communicate between independent Mastodon instances and other ActivityPub compatible services. Thus, Mastodon is generally considered to be a part of the Fediverse.

Services utilizing the ActivityPub protocol exist which allow for searching all posts on all instances as long as users opt-in.

For similar reasons, only hashtags can appear in a Mastodon instance's trending topics, not arbitrary popular words. Trending topics vary between instances, since individual instances are aware of different subsets of posts from the whole fediverse.

=== Security concerns ===
While Mastodon's decentralized structure is one of its most distinctive features, it also poses additional security challenges.

Since many Mastodon instances are run by volunteers, some security experts are concerned about data security and responsiveness to new threats and vulnerabilities across the network, considering the difficulty of configuring and maintaining an instance as well as uneven skill levels among administrators.

Administrators of an instance also have access to the private information of any users that are either registered with that instance or have federated private content to it, so a malicious administrator from either a local or remote instance can read private posts and direct messages if it has been stored onto the instance's database (which is not encrypted).

Configuration errors and security bugs in server implementations (either on Mastodon or another fediverse platform) has led to user data either being scraped or modified by attackers. It is worth noting that Mastodon also collects considerably less personal data, compared to other social media platforms, which makes it a lower-value target and reduces potential damage. The creator of Mastodon, Eugen Rochko, argues that these issues do not set it apart from other software products that can be hosted by non-professionals.

==== Previous issues ====
In 2023, the Mozilla Foundation contracted cybersecurity firm Cure53 to perform penetration testing on the Mastodon software, in preparation for establishing an instance for the Mozilla community. The testing discovered several vulnerabilities, including one called "TootRoot" that would have enabled arbitrary code execution and another that would have enabled cross-site scripting attacks through oEmbed cards. These vulnerabilities were patched in July 2023.

Mastodon has been the main suspect in an issue regarding the generation of OpenGraph link previews, wherein the data from the link is not cached by the post and transmitted to other instances. Many instances automatically fetch the preview data as soon as they receive the post, creating an accidental DDoS attack that can temporarily increase the load of a victim's server. A fix to add federation for link previews was planned for 4.3, but has since been delayed for Mastodon 4.4.

== Adoption ==
Introductory video explaining Mastodon

Mastodon was created by Eugen Rochko and revealed to the public via Hacker News in October 2016. It gained significant adoption in 2022 following the acquisition of Twitter by Elon Musk.

=== Early days ===
While Mastodon was first released in October 2016, the service began to expand in late March and early April 2017.

Servers were mostly operated by academic institutions, journalists, hobbyists, and activists.

The Verge wrote that the community at this time was small and that it had yet to attract the personalities that keep users at Twitter.

=== Rise of user population ===
Not long after, it quickly gained popularity and became the dominant platform in the fediverse and overtaking the previous platform, GNU social. The global use had risen from 766,500 users as of 1 August 2017, to 1 million users on 1 December 2017.

In November 2017 artists, writers, and entrepreneurs such as Chuck Wendig, John Scalzi, Melanie Gillman and later John O'Nolan joined Mastodon.

Another spike in popularity came in March through April 2018, due to the concerns about user privacy raised by the #deletefacebook effort.

Membership of Mastodon and other alternative social media sites increased in early December 2018 after Tumblr announced its intention to ban all adult content from the site.

In November 2019, nearly 20,000 Twitter users in India temporarily shifted to Mastodon over complaints by users against Twitter's moderation policies.

To circumvent the increasing online censorship of social networks in mainland China, an increasing number of Chinese-language users chose to migrate to Mastodon in 2022.

=== 2022 Twitter-related spikes in adoption ===
A spike in Mastodon's user participation occurred in April 2022, following the 25 April announcement of Elon Musk purchasing Twitter. By 27 April, 30,000 new users had joined Mastodon.

On 28 April 2022, the European Data Protection Supervisor (EDPS) launched the official ActivityPub microblogging platform (EU Voice) of the EU institutions, bodies and agencies (EUIs), based on Mastodon.

Musk's acquisition became final on 27 October 2022. Mastodon had an increase of 70,000 new users from a resultant "diaspora" on 28 October alone. Daily downloads increased substantially, rising from 3,400 daily downloads on 27 October to 113,400 on 6 November 2022.

According to Rochko, by 3 November, use of the federated network had grown to 665,000 active users, with a few growing pains. In particular, Mastodon's largest instance, mastodon.social, needed capacity upgrades to handle the new load. Accounts on a server called journa.host founded by Adam Davidson are restricted to professional journalists.

Mastodon's increased adoption continued in the days following the Twitter takeover. On 11 November, the number of new users of the platform compared to the previous week was reported to be 700,000, moving Mastodon over the 7 million user mark.

During that period, several prominent figures joined Mastodon, including prominent actors, comedians, journalists, political activists, and politicians. In December 2022, the number of monthly active users of Mastodon reached two million.

==== Twitter's reaction ====
On 15 December, the official Mastodon Twitter account was banned from Twitter, as well as other accounts with links to some Mastodon instances. On the following day, Twitter began to flag all Mastodon links as malware, preventing Twitter users from sharing them.

A Mediaite opinion piece on the bannings included an erroneous report of an account for "John Mastodon" (a misspelling of @joinmastodon), "founder of a competing social media company named after himself", being banned. Subsequently, Mastodon users wrote fictional backstories and memes about "John Mastodon" and circulated the hashtag #JohnMastodon.

Following the Mastodon suspension and ban on Mastodon links on Twitter, Twitter introduced a new policy on 18 December to prohibit sharing links on Twitter to a variety of social media websites, with Mastodon being one of those blocked.

The policy stated that it prohibited links in both tweets and account details and that accounts that violated the policy would be suspended.

By 19 December, the policy and official mentions about it had been removed from Twitter web pages. Musk stated the following day that banning users for posting Mastodon links had been a mistake.

Rochko stated that at least five venture capital firms looking to invest in Mastodon had been turned away by December 2022, and that Mastodon's nonprofit status would not be jeopardized.

=== Post-2022 spike ===
By the start of January 2023, Mastodon had 1.8 million active users, down 30% from its peak of over 2.5 million active users in early December 2022. On 19 March 2023, Mastodon surpassed the ten million mark for registered user accounts.

In July 2023, Mastodon’s founder, Eugen Rochko, stated that monthly active users were increasing again, surpassing the 2-million mark.

A study posted to arXiv in November 2023 showed that following Elon Musk's acquisition of Twitter and subsequent changes that ensued, there was a significant migration of users to alternative platforms.

== Instances and forks ==
As a result of its open source nature and ability to be deployed without restriction, various organizations, companies and governments have started their own Mastodon instances.

While most instances have mentioned their usage of Mastodon for the service and identify themselves as a Mastodon instance, a small minority of installations have attempted to conceal their origin by removing all mentions of Mastodon from the public view. These instances also do not release their source code modifications, violating the AGPLv3 license in use by Mastodon.

In 2017, Pixiv launched a Mastodon-based social network named Pawoo. The service was acquired by media company Russell in December 2019; in December 2022, Russell sold it to The Social Coop Limited, a Cayman Islands-based entity affiliated with Web3 firm Mask Network. Pawoo is banned by most instances on Mastodon due to allowing lolicon art.

Switter was an Australian instance aimed at sex workers established in 2018. It was closed in 2022 following the passage of legislation including the Online Safety Act 2021 in Australia and FOSTA and SESTA in the United States.

In April 2019, computer manufacturer Purism released a fork of Mastodon named Librem Social.

Gab, a controversial social network with a far-right user base, changed its software platform to a fork of Mastodon and became the largest Mastodon node in July 2019. Gab's adoption of Mastodon allowed Gab to be accessed from third-party Mastodon applications, although four of them blocked Gab shortly after the change. In response, Mastodon's main contributors stated in their blog that they were "completely opposed to Gab’s project and philosophy", and criticized Gab for attempting "to monetize and platform racist content while hiding behind the banner of free speech" and for "paywalling basic features that are freely available on Mastodon". Gab later removed ActivityPub federation from its codebase due to various perceived technical issues, as well as plans to build its own protocol.

Tooter is an Indian social networking product launched in September 2020 that uses the Mastodon source code, initially without releasing its modifications. The service also identified itself as being wholly made in India, despite its origin.

In October 2021, (at the time) former President of the United States Donald Trump founded Truth Social, which is based on Mastodon. Initially, Truth Social did not make its source code available, violating Mastodon's AGPLv3 license. Eugen Rochko sent a formal letter to Truth Social's chief legal officer on 26 October 2021. On 12 November 2021, Truth Social silently published its source code.

In April 2022, the European Union launched its own Mastodon and PeerTube instances via the European Data Protection Supervisor, dubbing them "EU Voice" and "EU Video". The instances were a test run of whether it would be sustainable to run its own social media platforms. While the pilot ended two years later in 2024 (after an extension in 2023 for an additional year) and taking the instances offline after being unable to find an organization that would take over operations, the European Commission has launched their own separate instance.

In December 2022, the Mozilla Foundation launched a Mastodon instance under mozilla.social, initially with closed registrations before opening it up as a private beta. However, the instance has since been discontinued and is offline as of 17 December 2024.

In February 2024, queer.af, an invite-only instance aimed at the LGBTQ community, halted operations when the Taliban-led Government of Afghanistan seized the domain name, which used Afghanistan's .af country code top-level domain.

== Maintenance ==
=== Funding ===
Development of Mastodon is crowdfunded, and the software does not contain any support for advertisements or monetized features. As an additional revenue source, Mastodon offers paid hosting, moderation, and support of Mastodon servers for larger organisations, such as the European Commission and the German state of Schleswig-Holstein.

In mid-January 2025, the Mastodon team announced that control of the project would transition from Rochko to a new European non-profit organization, and called for funding assistance.

In April 2026, the organization was awarded €614,000 by the German government's Sovereign Tech Fund to fund five major projects: block list synchronization, remote media storage, automated content detection, end-to-end encryption for private messages, and documentation improvements.

=== Structure ===
The project is maintained by the German non-profit Mastodon gGmbH, which was headed by founder Eugen Rochko until he stepped down as CEO on 18 November 2025 to be replaced by Felix Hlatky. The organisation chose to reward Rochko with a one-time compensation of 1 million euro for his past contributions to the project.

Mastodon was registered in Germany as a nonprofit organization (German: gemeinnützige GmbH) between 2021 and 2024; a US nonprofit was established in April 2024. The organization started selling stuffed toys of its mascot in October 2024.

== See also ==
- Bluesky (social network) – Social platform
- Comparison of microblogging services
- Comparison of software and protocols for distributed social networking
- Diaspora (social network) – Nonprofit, user-owned, distributed social network
- Fediverse – Network of federated social media platforms
- Misskey – Open source, federated, social networking service
