= Pump.io =

Decentralized social network and protocol

pump.io
- Original author: Evan Prodromou et al.
- Developer: E14N
- Release: October 3, 2012; 14 years ago
- Final release: 5.1.4 / 18 September 2020; 6 years ago
- Written in: JavaScript (Node.js)
- Operating system: Cross-platform
- Type: Web application framework
- License: Apache License 2.0
- Website: pumpio.org
- Repository: https://github.com/pump-io/pump.io

pump.io is an implementation of a social networking service built on a common communication protocol that can be used in a federated social network. Started by Evan Prodromou, it is a follow-up to his previous microblogging software StatusNet (later merged into GNU social) and its OStatus protocol. It is designed to be more lightweight and usable for general activity streams instead of the predecessor's focus on microblogging timelines.

Development of the software started in September 2011, with an initial version being released on October 3, 2012. identi.ca, the largest StatusNet instance at the time (which was also ran by Prodromou), converted to pump.io in June 2013.

While never becoming as popular as its predecessor, the ActivityPump protocol that was designed for it was later used as a template for the creation and standardization of the ActivityPub standard, and development of pump.io has since been discontinued, with the latest version of the engine being released in 2020 and further development concluding by 2022.

== Technology ==
Pump.io is written in Node.js and uses Activity Streams as the format for commands and to transfer data via a simple REST inbox API. The software package also uses a NoSQL database such as MongoDB or Redis, and requires GraphicsMagick for uploading media.

Pump.io can easily be run on hardware with less resources, such as a Raspberry Pi or any other single-board computer. It can be used either with the included Web UI, or other clients via its API.

As a federated social network, pump.io is not tied to a single site. Users across servers can subscribe to and communicate with each other, and if one or more individual nodes go offline the rest of the network remains intact.

=== ActivityPump ===
ActivityPump
- Communication protocol
- Purpose: Federated social networking
- Developer: Evan Prodromou et al.
- Based on: Activity Streams
- Influenced: ActivityPub

ActivityPump is the protocol used by pump.io to allow for federation of user content between different pump.io instances. Compared to OStatus, its microblogging-oriented predecessor, ActivityPump uses the Activity Streams format and its vocabulary to allow for more general interactions between users, as well as to make development of alternative ActivityPump-based social networks easier for software developers, who were forced to operate within the limits of OStatus and its core technologies.

== Standardization ==
The W3C Social Web Working Group was launched in July 2014, originally to build on the OpenSocial standard. The working group later changed focus towards building on ActivityPump, using it as a base to build the ActivityPub standard. It was officially published as a Recommendation on January 23, 2018.

== See also ==
- Comparison of software and protocols for distributed social networking
- diaspora*, a contemporary social networking suite that was similar to pump.io
