= Jira Studio =

- Developer: Atlassian
- Initial release: June 5, 2008
- Final release: June 2011 / June 23, 2011
- Written in: Java
- Operating system: Cross-platform
- Type: SaaS
- License: Proprietary
- Website: https://www.atlassian.com/hosted/studio/

Jira Studio was an integrated, hosted software development suite developed by Atlassian Software Systems. Jira Studio included Subversion for revision control, Jira for issue tracking and bug tracking, Confluence for content management, Jira Agile (previously known as GreenHopper)

for agile planning and management, Bamboo for continuous integration, Crucible for code review and FishEye for source code repository browsing.

Jira Studio was retired in February 2013. The Atlassian Cloud offers the same SaaS hosted model, integrations, and plugin capability, but is licensed per product.

== Integration ==
Jira Studio supported Atlassian's IDE connectors for Eclipse, Visual Studio and IntelliJ IDEA.

Information in Jira Studio could be displayed in external systems using OpenSocial gadgets, and project information could be externally accessed using Activity Streams.

For programmatic access, Jira Studio provided APIs based on REST and Java.
