= Wikivoyage =

Free volunteer web-based travel guide

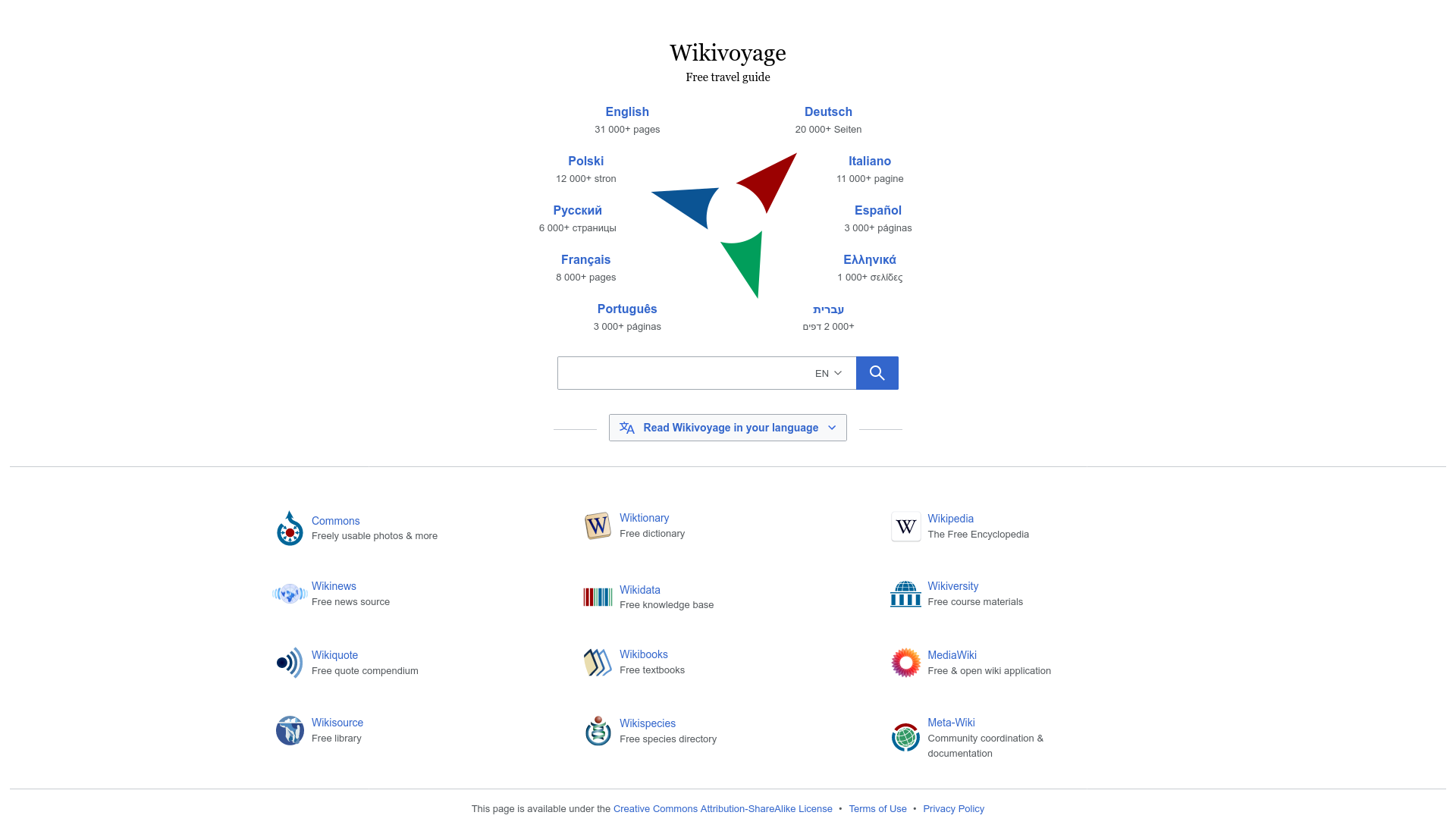
- Screenshot A screenshot of Wikivoyage's portal in 2023
- Website type: Wiki
- Available in: 28 active editions (English, German, Italian, Polish, French, Persian, Russian, Chinese, Dutch, Portuguese, Spanish, Bangla, Hebrew, Japanese, Finnish, Indonesian, Swedish, Vietnamese, Esperanto, Greek, Ukrainian, Romanian, Czech, Turkish, Malayalam, Pashto, Shan, Hindi)
- Headquarters: United States (formerly Germany)
- Owner: Wikimedia Foundation (non-profit)
- Creator: Wikivoyage e.V. association
- Website: wikivoyage.org
- Commercial: No
- Registration: Optional
- Launched: First version (German language) December 10, 2006; 19 years ago. English-language version January 15, 2013; 13 years ago
- Content license: CC BY-SA 4.0

Wikivoyage is a free web-based travel guide for travel destinations and travel topics written by volunteer authors. It is a sister project of Wikipedia and supported and hosted by the same non-profit Wikimedia Foundation (WMF). Wikivoyage has been called the "Wikipedia of travel guides".

The project began when editors at the German and then Italian versions of Wikitravel decided in September 2006 to move their editing activities and then current content to a new site, in accordance with the site copyright license, a procedure known as "forking". The resulting site went live as "Wikivoyage" on December 10, 2006, and was owned and operated by a German association set up for that purpose, Wikivoyage e.V. (which continues to be its representative association). Content was published under the copyleft license Creative Commons Attribution-ShareAlike.

In 2012, after a long history of problems with their existing host, the English-language version community of Wikitravel also decided to fork their project. In a two-way move, the English Wikitravel community re-merged with Wikivoyage under the Wikivoyage brand. In addition, all Wikivoyage language versions moved their operations to be hosted by the Wikimedia Foundation, a non-profit organization hosting several of the world's largest wiki-based communities such as Wikipedia. Following agreements by the various communities involved and the Wikimedia Foundation, the site was moved to the WMF servers as a beta project in November 2012 and the whole of Wikivoyage was officially re-launched as a Wikimedia project on January 15, 2013, the day of the 12th anniversary of Wikipedia's launch. The guide was launched as a practical resource for travelers that was meant to be read online or printed and hopefully more up-to-date than printed travel books.

== Description ==
Using a wiki model, Wikivoyage is built through collaboration of Wikivoyagers from around the globe. Articles can cover different levels of geographic specificity, from continents to city districts. These are logically connected in a hierarchy, by specifying that the location covered in one article "is within" the larger location described by another. The project also includes articles on travel-related topics, phrasebooks for travelers, and suggested itineraries.

Wikivoyage is a multilingual project available in 28 languages, with each language-specific project developed independently. While now a Wikimedia project, it was begun independently. Wikivoyage content is broadly categorized as destinations, itineraries, phrasebooks, and travel topics.

=== Destinations ===
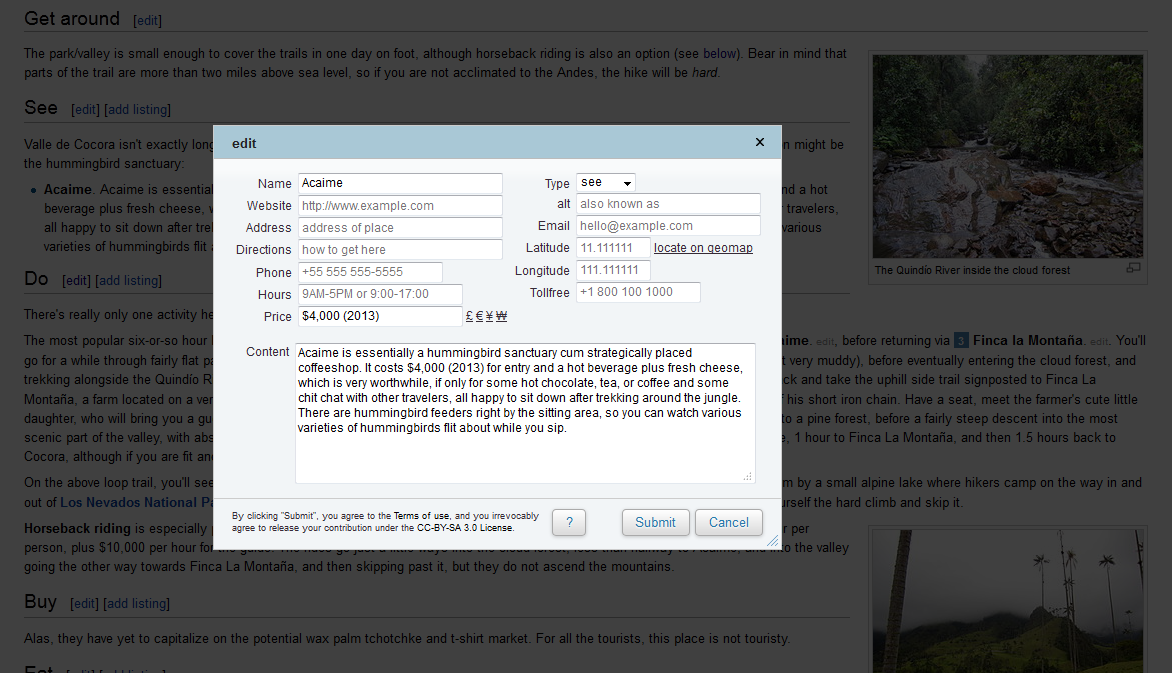
The Wikivoyage listing editor

Geographical units within the geographical hierarchy may be described in articles, based on the criterion, "can you sleep there?"

The hierarchy includes:

- Continents
- Continental sections (like the Nordic countries)
- Countries
- Regions within countries (provinces, counties, states, groups of states, etc.)
- Cities of any size, including fairly small villages if they are tourist destinations
- Districts within large cities
- National parks provided they have accommodation for the traveller

Attractions such as hotels, restaurants, bars, stores, nightclubs, tour operators, monuments, museums, statues or other works of art, city parks, town squares or streets, festivals or events, transport systems or stations, landscapes, bodies of water, and uninhabited islands are listed in the article for the place within which they are located, but they do not get their own articles.

=== Itineraries ===
An itinerary describes a group of destinations according to a temporal division rather than a spatial one and will list destinations and attractions to visit during a given amount of time, with recommended durations of stay and routes to follow. Itineraries may cross geographical regions, but usually have a well-defined path.

=== Phrasebooks ===
A phrasebook includes:

1. An overview of the language, giving a brief history, scope (where it is spoken, how many speakers), alphabet or symbol set, and any other general info on the language.
2. A pronunciation guide, with a description of each written symbol in the language (that is, its alphabet), and a pronunciation note for each symbol.
3. A phrase list. Each entry in the phrase list includes the word or phrase being translated, the spelling in the local language symbol set as it would be seen written down, and a pronunciation cue.

=== Travel topics ===
Travel topics are articles that deal with a specific topic of interest to travelers that is too large or detailed to go in a specific travel guide destination page; travel tips that are so general that they apply to nearly all destinations and do not need to be in each specific travel guide; major events that occur in different places; and specialist travel information, such as regional guides to scuba-diving sites.

== Organization and operation ==
=== Mode of operation ===
Wikivoyage uses the free MediaWiki software (developed for Wikipedia) to allow internet-based editing without requiring registration. Quality assurance occurs in the same way as on Wikipedia: through reciprocal control by editors. The use of the same software was intended to facilitate familiarization with Wikivoyage.

=== Copyright ===
Wikivoyage licenses its content to the public under the Creative Commons Attribution-ShareAlike license, but not the GNU Free Documentation License. This is intended to facilitate the production of printed guides from a legal point of view. Media files are intended to be published either in the public domain or licensed under multiple licenses (GNU, Creative Commons).

=== Information structure ===
The information is built up in a more structured way than usual for encyclopaedias. Articles belonging to a topic are grouped by the categories known from the Mediawiki software as well as through the so-called bread crumb trails which show the geographical connection between the articles.

In the German-language version, different name spaces are used to separate different topics. The main name space contains travel destinations within their geographical hierarchy. Two other important name spaces are reserved for travel topics and travel news, with the intent to allow a tight interconnection between travel destinations and topics.

The content design is decided by consensus of the community of authors.

=== Languages ===
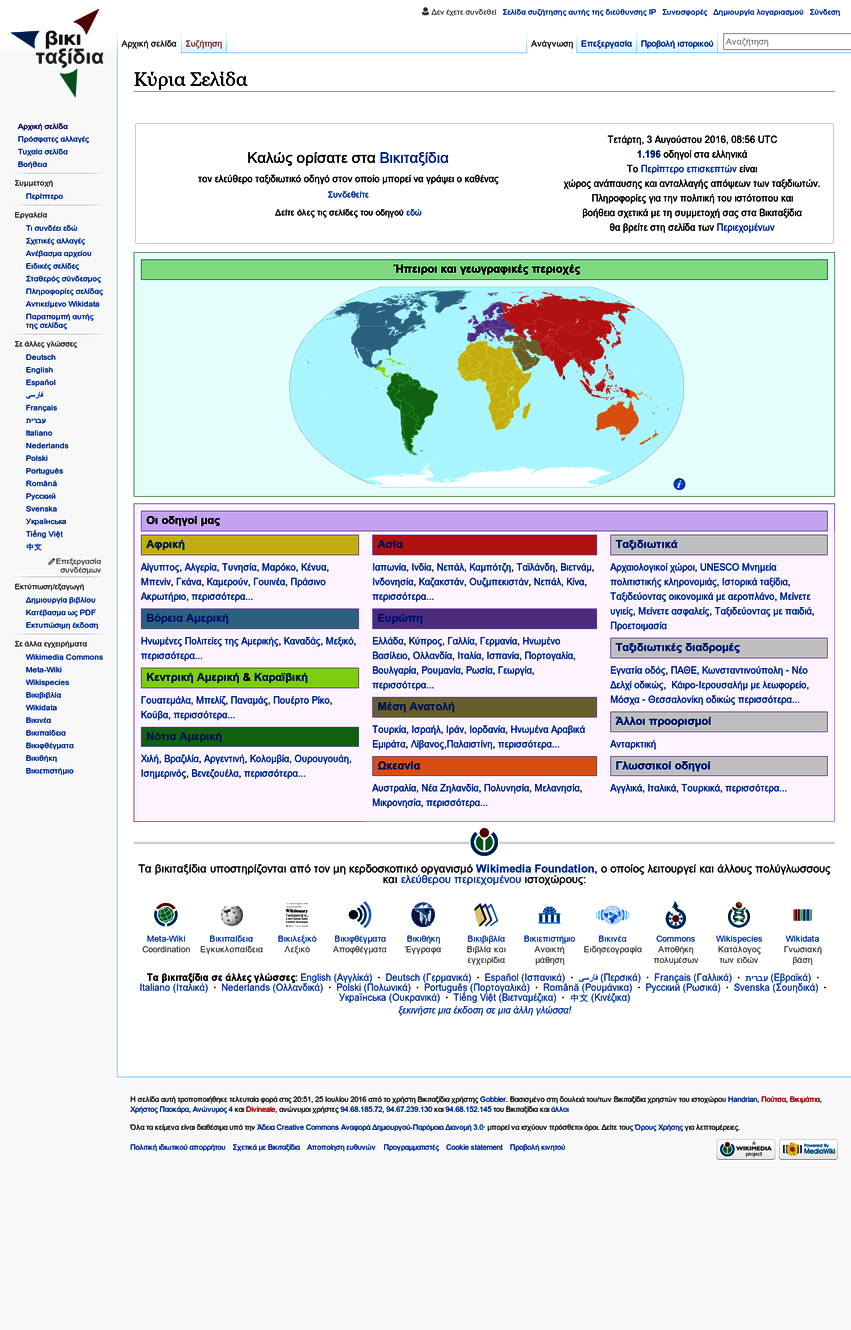
Screenshot of Greek Wikivoyage's main page

At the time of transfer to WMF, Wikivoyage was available in German, Italian, English, French, Dutch, Russian, and Swedish language versions. The Russian-language project is named Викигид (which translates roughly as "wiki guide"). In January 2013, Portuguese and Spanish versions were created, followed in March by Polish and Romanian, in April by Hebrew and Ukrainian, in May by Greek, and in August by Vietnamese. The Chinese version started in January 2014 and Persian in October. The Finnish version launched in November 2016, Hindi in September 2017, and Bengali and Pashto in June 2018. A Japanese version began in August 2020, a Turkish one in 2021, a Shan one in March 2022, and an Indonesian one in December 2024.

=== Statistics ===
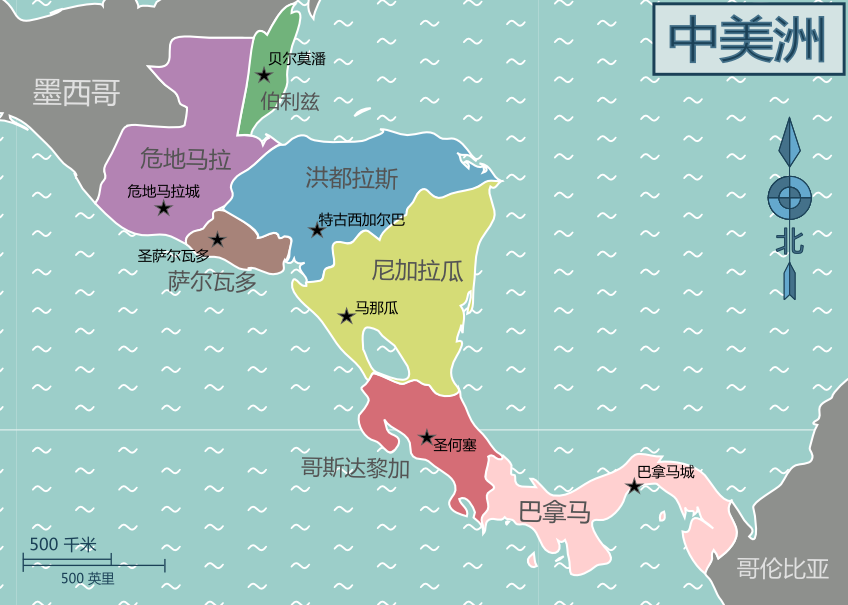
The Chinese Wikivoyage's map of Central America

As of November 2026, there are Wikivoyage sites for 28 languages of which 28 are active and 0 are closed. The active sites have 148,788 articles. There are 2,848,122 registered users of which 2,323 were recently active.

The top ten Wikivoyage language projects by mainspace article count:

No.	Language	Wiki	Good	Total	Edits	Admins	Users	Active users	Files
1	English	en	34,831	183,940	5,412,561	32	2,441,722	1,098	1,930
2	German	de	21,023	112,634	1,799,037	12	58,891	184	726
3	Italian	it	13,924	45,806	940,530	4	39,330	59	0
4	Polish	pl	13,826	16,529	159,761	3	17,717	28	0
5	French	fr	10,245	27,712	672,514	5	57,307	102	88
6	Persian	fa	8,693	31,799	126,400	1	16,943	12	24
7	Russian	ru	7,144	37,319	783,926	4	43,562	91	18,188
8	Chinese	zh	5,597	26,925	222,505	7	20,220	39	273
9	Dutch	nl	4,363	12,759	161,632	4	17,611	23	0
10	Portuguese	pt	4,051	11,321	145,986	2	19,269	29	0

For a complete list with totals see Wikimedia Statistics:

=== Distribution ===
The choice of the Creative Commons Attribution-ShareAlike copyright license is intended to allow simplified distribution by mention of the authors, without the need to state the complete license text.

Creative Commons Attribution-ShareAlike allows distribution through mirrors or by other means of modern media. Up-to-date archives are provided on a weekly basis. The files contained in these archives are provided with all the necessary legal licensing information, e.g. the attribution of the authors.

== History ==
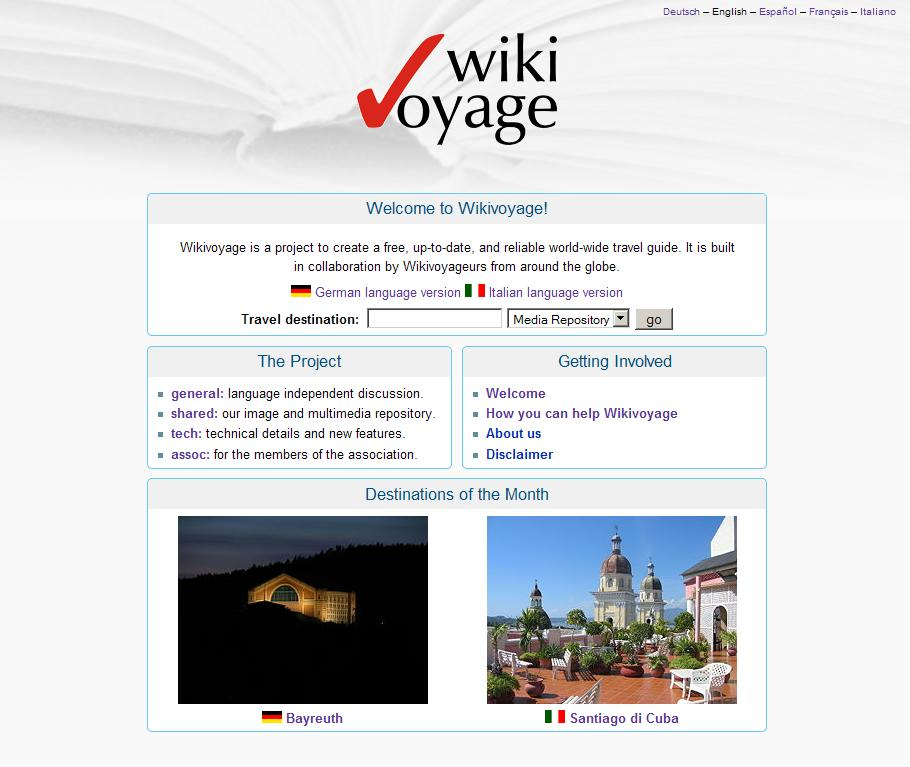
Screenshot of Wikivoyage's portal before the WMF migration

The name is a portmanteau of the words "wiki" (an Internet-based software system that allows change and extension of the text by any user) and "voyage", meaning travel, journey, or trip. It was retained after extensive voting amongst established editors to decide on the post re-launch name.

=== Launch ===
Many Wikivoyage authors and administrators started by working on Wikitravel, which was started by Evan Prodromou and Michele Ann Jenkins in July 2003. By April 2004 the wiki's collection totalled over 1,200 destinations. A year later the project was acquired by the for-profit Internet Brands, an operator of media and e-commerce sites. Discontent increased in response to the management style of the new owners, which led to the contributors of the German- and Italian-language editions leaving to set up their own independent project, while forking the content on Wikitravel.

After about six months of preparation, the non-profit association Wikivoyage e.V. was founded and registered, as both the owner of the domain names and operator of the servers. On December 10, 2006, the project went live online with the initial data from the German-language Wikitravel. After seven months, 40% of the articles were new, rising to 50% after 10 months. At this stage there were still major gaps in the coverage, but there were several articles for travel destinations like Egypt, Thailand and Switzerland and for the travel topic "cycling".

The Italian branch of Wikivoyage was launched on December 10, 2007. The organization of media data and the administration of user access were already applicable for use in branches in other languages.

The project garnered some press reports, particularly by Swiss radio and newspapers. The Tages-Anzeiger from Zurich and the Swiss radio station DRS1 reported broadly on the project and discussed its weaknesses. The project was mainly supported by German and Swiss authors.

=== Additional languages and migration ===
In 2012, after a lengthy history of dissatisfaction with Wikitravel's host and owner, Internet Brands, it was proposed that the community at Wikitravel fork their work from Wikitravel and Wikitravel Shared and – together with the existing sites at Wikivoyage – merge to create a new travel wiki hosted by the Wikimedia Foundation, the steward of Wikipedia and a large range of other non-profit reference sites based upon a wiki community culture. After lengthy discussion by users of all three communities, comments by their respective hosts, and confirmation by the Wikimedia Foundation that it would host a travel project if users wished, nearly all administrators and bureaucrats at Wikitravel decided to fork their existing work to Wikivoyage.

The contents of Wikitravel in all languages and its related Commons-equivalent site (for images, video, and other media files) were downloaded on August 2, 2012, as a "database dump" in preparation for such a migration. This content became the starting point for all languages excluding German and Italian, which were already hosted by Wikivoyage. Forking is a normal or anticipated activity in wiki communities and is expressly permitted by the Creative Commons–Attribution–Share Alike (CC BY-SA) copyright license in use on sites such as Wikitravel. MediaWiki, the wiki software used for Wikitravel, included that facility, although Internet Brands disabled the function shortly after this date in an attempt to prevent the data migration. The community discussion at Wikimedia ended on August 23, 2012, with 540 votes for and 152 votes against the creation of a Wikimedia Foundation travel guide. The project began in beta on WMF servers on November 10, 2012 and was re-launched on January 15, 2013 with 50,000 articles about travel such as itineraries and destinations. Like Wikipedia, Wikivoyage does not have ads and anyone can edit it.

As part of the migration, it is planned that current owners and user body "Wikivoyage e.V." will remain in place as an associated organization affiliated with the Wikimedia Foundation "at an organizational level". Wikivoyage stated that, freed of the need to maintain its servers, it would be able to benefit by increasing its work related to outreach, community support, discussion and information, and technical enhancements to the site's software.

In September 2012, Internet Brands filed a lawsuit against one Wikitravel administrator, Ryan Holliday, and one Wikipedia administrator, James Heilman, accusing them of trademark breach and commercial misconduct in the proposals affecting that site, with the defendants and Wikimedia rejecting the case as an example of a SLAPP lawsuit—one that is undertaken without plausible legal grounds for the primary purpose of deterring, overwhelming, or frustrating people engaged in fully lawful actions. On November 19, 2012, the claims by Internet Brands were dismissed by the United States District Court for the Central District of California.

=== Since migration ===
In 2021, the blogger Gaganpreet claimed Wikivoyage was not being indexed by Bing, Yahoo or DuckDuckGo.

== Reception ==
Sarah Mitroff writing in Wired wrote that WikiVoyage was late to an already crowded and competitive travel industry when it launched in 2013, including competitors like Yelp, TripAdvisor, Lonely Planet, and Google which had recently purchased Frommer's which helped to give it more travel data for its search results. The review saw a place for WikiTravel in places where connectivity was difficult or expensive and carrying print-out guides would be convenient. Mitroff cautioned that the site still had lots of holes in its coverage and worried about the incentives for spammers to plug their businesses.

Mark Johanson writing in International Business Times reviewed the site at its launch in 2013 and said it had the potential to disrupt the guide book industry as it was structured to provide a comprehensive guide focused on practical tips. Douglas Quinby, a senior researcher at PhoCusWright dismissed the idea that Wikivoyage would succeed citing the growing importance of social media and the well-funded businesses (like Expedia, Kayak, Tripadvisor and Google) already trying to innovate and compete in that space.

Simon Sharwood writing in 2013 in The Register questioned the need for WikiVoyage with Wikitravel offering many of the same features without evidence of edit wars and spam but welcomed the competition with TripAdvisor which he said struggled to moderate negative reviews that could be coming from rival business. Sharwood hopes that Wikivoyage will move higher up the search engine results for travel searches in place of some of the hotel booking services that often rise to the top.

Nick Douglas in Lifehacker in 2018 recommended WikiVoyage as a great starting place for travelers looking to get an overview of a place that was more relevant and fun than reading Wikipedia articles on a place. Douglas said that Wikivoyage had grown larger and gotten more edits than Wikitravel, which never mentions Wikivoyage.

In 2021, Brendan Luyt reviewed Wikivoyage's coverage of Cambodia and found it was not on pace to threaten the travel guide book market, but still held potential.

== See also ==
- List of content forks of Wikipedia
- Travel technology
