= Randall G. Knutson =

American attorney

Randall G. "Randy" Knutson is an American attorney and the founding partner of the law firm Knutson+Casey, based in Mankato, Minnesota.

== Early life and education ==
Knutson grew up in Tiffin, Ohio, and graduated from Columbian High School in 1981. He attended Macalester College in St. Paul, Minnesota, earning a bachelor's degree in Economics in 1985. He obtained his Juris Doctor cum laude from Hamline University School of Law in 1992.

== Career ==
Knutson began his legal career in Minnesota in 1992. He initially practiced in northern Minnesota, where he co-founded the firm Baer, Knutson & Associates and served as an attorney for the White Earth Nation and the Shooting Star Casino. He later relocated to southern Minnesota, becoming a partner at the firms Frentz & Frentz and later the Farrish Johnson Law Office.

While at Farrish Johnson, Knutson was lead counsel for Bearder v. State of Minnesota (2011). In this case, the Minnesota Supreme Court ruled that the Minnesota Department of Health had violated the state's Genetic Privacy Act by unlawfully collecting and storing newborn blood samples without parental consent. The ruling led to the destruction of stored samples.

In October 2014, Knutson co-founded the firm Knutson+Casey in Mankato, where he serves as senior partner. He focuses on plaintiff's personal injury law, including automobile accidents, Wrongful death, and Product liability. Knutson is also licensed to practice before the United States Court of Federal Claims, also known as the Vaccine Court. He is admitted to practice in Minnesota, Iowa, and Texas.

Knutson's work has included advocacy for victims of Sexual abuse. In 2018, he represented a mother and daughter enrolled in a state Address confidentiality program, filing a suit against Wells Fargo for allegedly revealing their protected address; the case was settled. His firm also represented a family in a civil lawsuit against a property management company after a teenager was sexually abused by a maintenance worker and the family reportedly faced eviction after reporting the incident, resulting in a financial settlement.

In 2021, Knutson, along with attorneys from Jeff Anderson & Associates and TSR Injury Law, represented four boys who were sexually exploited at a juvenile treatment center in Duluth (Minor Does v. The Hills Youth and Family Services). The civil litigation resulted in an undisclosed seven-figure settlement in 2021.

== Personal life ==
Knutson is an endurance-sports enthusiast and triathlete who has completed Ironman races. He is the founder and race director of the annual Mankato Mud Run, an obstacle-course race whose proceeds benefit area charities. He has also coached youth soccer, football, baseball, and basketball.

Knutson is a member and organizer of the Mankato Marathon's volunteer "Bike Medic" team, which patrols the course to assist runners. He was recognized as a Visit Mankato “Volunteer of the Year” in 2023 for this work. He lives in the Mankato area and has served on boards including the Greater Mankato Convention & Visitors Bureau and the Mankato Sports Commission. He also founded a local children's triathlon club, the “Green Hornets.”

== Awards and recognition ==
Knutson was named one of Minnesota's Attorneys of the Year by Minnesota Lawyer in 2011 for the Bearder case and again in 2021 for his advocacy for sexual abuse victims, shared with colleague Brooke Holmes and others. He has been listed in Minnesota Super Lawyers annually from 2011 through 2025, and was named one of the "Top 100" attorneys in Minnesota in 2018 and 2019. The National Trial Lawyers]organization has named him among the Top 100 Trial Lawyers.
