= Breather (disambiguation) =

Breather may refer to:

- Breather - in physics, a breather is a nonlinear wave in which energy concentrates in a localized and oscillatory fashion
- Breather (company) - an Airbnb-like office space company

Other uses:

- I, the Breather, American metalcore band
- Breather switch, international gap in railway to allow for track expansion
- Breather Resist, American hardcore punk band
- Breather Life, album by American rapper Krazy
