= Comparison of microblogging and similar services =

The tables below compare general and technical information for some notable active microblogging services, and also social network services that have status updates.

== General information ==
| Service | Owner | Launched | Primary service | Software license | Content license | Multilingual | Ad-free | Federated |
|---|---|---|---|---|---|---|---|---|
| Bluesky | Open source | 2021-10-21 | social network | MIT | own TOS | 19 | Yes | Yes |
| Diaspora | Open source | 2010-11 | social network | AGPLv3-or-later | AGPLv3 | 31 | Yes | Yes |
| Facebook | Meta | 2004-02-04 | social network | Proprietary | own TOS | 112 | No | No |
| Friendica | Open source | 2010-07 | social network | AGPLv3-or-later | own TOS | Yes | Yes | Yes |
| GNU social | Open source | 2010-03-03 | microblogging | AGPLv3-or-later | CC BY 3.0 | 70 | Yes | Yes |
| identi.ca | Open source | 2008-07-02 | microblogging | Apache v2 (pump.io) | CC BY 3.0 | Yes | Yes | Yes |
| Mastodon | Open source | 2016-10 | microblogging | AGPLv3-or-later | own TOS | 93 | Yes | Yes |
| Micro.blog | Riverfold Software | 2017-04-24 | microblogging | Mixed | Mixed | Yes | Yes | Yes |
| Movim | Open source | 2011-03 | social network | AGPLv3-or-later | AGPLv3 | 59 | Yes | Yes |
| Pleroma | Open source | 2019-02-22 | microblogging | AGPLv3 | CC BY 4.0 | 37 | Yes | Yes |
| Steam community | Valve Corporation | 2003-09-12 | content delivery; social network service | Proprietary | own TOS | 28 | Yes | No |
| Threads | Meta | 2023-07-05 | microblogging | Proprietary | own TOS | 31 | Yes | Partly |
| Tout | Tout | 2010-04 | microblogging | Proprietary | own TOS | Yes | Yes | No |
| Tumblr | Automattic | 2007 | microblogging | Proprietary | own TOS | Yes | No | No |
| Twister | Open source | 2013-12-30 | microblogging | MIT & BSD | own TOS | 2:en,ru | Yes | Partly |
| Weibo | Sina Corporation | 2009-08 | microblogging | Proprietary | own TOS | Yes | No | No |
| Viva Engage | Yammer, Inc. | 2008-09 | microblogging | Proprietary | own TOS | Yes | Yes | No |
| X (Twitter) | X Corp. | 2006-08 | microblogging | Proprietary | own TOS | Yes | No | No |

== Features ==
An overview of integral features. Extras may be provided by third-party applications/services, but are not listed here.

| Service | Tagging (Note: Tagging in micro-blogging services is often done with hashtags.) | Groups | Conversation (Note: The ability to see whole conversation (multiple replies) on one flat page.) | Private (Note: If this service has the ability to hide posts from the general public.) | Private following list | RSS | Atom | Bookmarklet |
|---|---|---|---|---|---|---|---|---|
| Bluesky | Yes | No | Yes | No | No | Yes | No | Yes |
| Facebook | Yes | Yes | Yes | Yes | ? | No | No | No |
| Friendica | Yes | Yes | Yes | Yes | Yes | Yes | Yes | Yes |
| GNU social | Yes | Yes | Yes | Yes | Yes | Yes | Yes | Yes |
| Mastodon | Yes | No | Yes | Yes | Yes | Yes | Yes | Yes |
| Micro.blog | Yes | No | Yes | No | ? | Yes | No | No |
| Movim | Yes | Yes | Yes | Yes | Yes | Yes | Yes | Yes |
| Steam community | Yes | Yes | Yes | Yes | Yes | ? | ? | ? |
| Tumblr | Yes | No | No | Yes | Yes | Yes | No | Yes |
| Weibo | Yes | Yes | Yes | Yes | Yes | No | No | No |
| X (Twitter) | Yes | Yes | Yes | Yes | Yes | No | No | Yes |

== Posting and reading ==
Communication methods supported by the services. Extras may be provided by third-party applications/services, but are not listed here.

| Service | Post via | | | | | | Read via | | | | | | |
| Service | Web | XMPP | Email | SMS | API | Micropub | Web | XMPP | Email | SMS | API | Feed | ActivityPub |
|---|---|---|---|---|---|---|---|---|---|---|---|---|---|
| Facebook | Yes | No | Yes | Yes | Yes | No | Yes | No | Yes | Yes | Yes | No | No |
| Friendica | Yes | No | No | No | Yes | No | Yes | No | No | No | Yes | Yes | Yes |
| GNU social | Yes | Yes | Yes | Yes | Yes | No | Yes | Yes | Yes | Yes | Yes | Yes | Yes |
| Mastodon | Yes | No | No | No | Yes | No | Yes | No | Optional | No | Yes | Yes | Yes |
| Micro.blog | Yes | Yes | No | No | Yes | Yes | Yes | Yes | Yes | No | Yes | Yes | Yes |
| Movim | Yes | Yes | No | No | Yes | ? | Yes | Yes | No | No | Yes | Yes | No |
| X (Twitter) | Yes | No | No | Yes | Yes | No | Yes | No | No | Yes | Yes | Yes | No |

== See also ==
- Microblogging
- OpenMicroBlogging
- Microblogging in China
