= BIGADDA =

Indian e-commerce website

- Company type: Subsidiary
- Website type: Social network service
- Available in: English
- Founded: 2007
- Headquarters: Mumbai, {{{location_country}}}
- Owner: Reliance Entertainment
- Key people: Rajesh Sawhney, President
- Website: www.bigadda.com
- Advertising: Google, AdSense, Proprietary
- Registration: Required
- Launched: August 2007
- Current status: Inactive since 2011

BIGADDA was an Indian e-commerce website owned by Reliance Entertainment, part of the Reliance Anil Dhirubhai Ambani Group. The site was a social network site.

BIGADDA claimed that the top 20 cities account for 45% users from within India while 40% of the users come from Tier III cities like Tuticorin, Bhilai, Amritsar, Guwahati, Surat, Nasik.

Dataquest, a popular IT journal also featured BIGADDA along with sites like IndyaRocks & BharatStudent as one of the top 25 web 2.0 start-ups in India.

== Features ==
Users could upload and share unlimited photos for free, can upload and share music, and can listen to a varied range of songs.

An application platform that was OpenSocial v0.8 compliant was provided. It included some games from Zapak (a partner site) and other applications.

Bigadda closed its operations in 2011 in the face of stiff competition from other social networking sites such as Facebook and Twitter.

== See also ==
- List of social networking websites
- Social network
- Social software
- OpenSocial
