= Portable Contacts =

Open protocol for contact lists

Portable Contacts is an open protocol to make it easier for developers to give users a secure way to access the address books and friends lists they have accrued online. The goal of the project is to increase data portability by creating a common and open specification to bridge proprietary contacts APIs such as Google's GData Contacts API, Yahoo's Address Book API, and Microsoft's Live Contacts API. It combines OAuth, XRDS-Simple and a wire-format based on vCard harmonized with schema from OpenSocial.

The editor of the Portable Contacts standard was Joseph Smarr of Plaxo and the project was co-maintained by Chris Messina.

Portable Contacts has been used by services such as Google Contacts, Windows Live Messenger Connect, as well as other specification such as OStatus.
