= Diaspora (social network) =

Nonprofit, user-owned, distributed social network

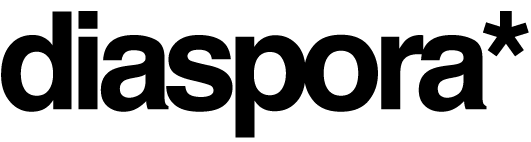

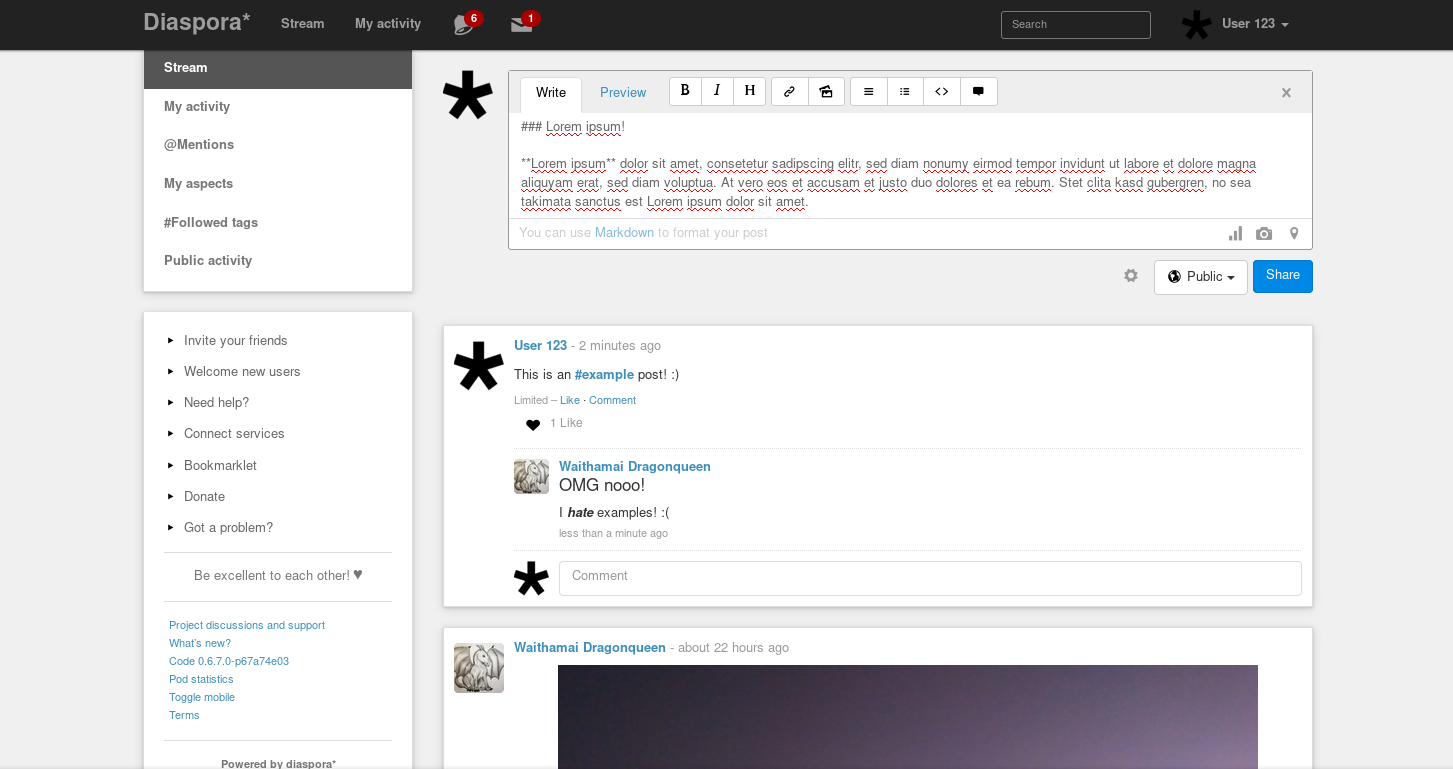
- Example of a Diaspora pod
- Website type: Social networking
- Owners: Diaspora's web presence is owned by FSSN. Each pod (node), however, is owned and operated by a different provider.
- Creators: Dan Grippi, Maxwell Salzberg, Raphael Sofaer, Ilya Zhitomirskiy
- Website: diasporafoundation.org
- Commercial: No
- Registration: Yes
- Users: 859,000+
- Launched: November 2010; 16 years ago
- Current status: Active
- Written in: Ruby (Ruby on Rails)

Diaspora
- Stable release: 0.9.1.0 / 7 April 2026; 7 months ago
- Written in: Ruby on Rails
- License: GNU-AGPL-3.0
- Website: diasporafoundation.org
- Repository: github.com/diaspora/diaspora

Diaspora (stylized as diaspora*) is a nonprofit, user-owned, distributed social network. It consists of a group of independently owned nodes (called pods) which interoperate to form the network. The social network is not owned by any one person or entity, keeping it from being subject to corporate take-overs or advertising. According to its developer, "our distributed design means no big corporation will ever control Diaspora."

The project was founded by Dan Grippi, Maxwell Salzberg, Raphael Sofaer and Ilya Zhitomirskiy, students at New York University's Courant Institute of Mathematical Sciences. The group received crowdfunding in excess of $200,000 via Kickstarter. A consumer alpha version was released on 23 November 2010.

Diaspora software is licensed under the terms of GNU-AGPL-3.0. Its development is managed by the Diaspora Foundation, which is part of the Free Software Support Network (FSSN). The FSSN is in turn run by Eben Moglen and the Software Freedom Law Center. The FSSN acts as an umbrella organization to Diaspora development and manages Diaspora's branding, finances and legal assets.

== History ==
=== Inception ===
The Diaspora project was founded in 2010 by four students at New York University's Courant Institute of Mathematical Sciences, Ilya Zhitomirskiy, Dan Grippi, Max Salzberg, and Raphael Sofaer. The word diaspora is Greek in origin and refers to a scattered or dispersed population.

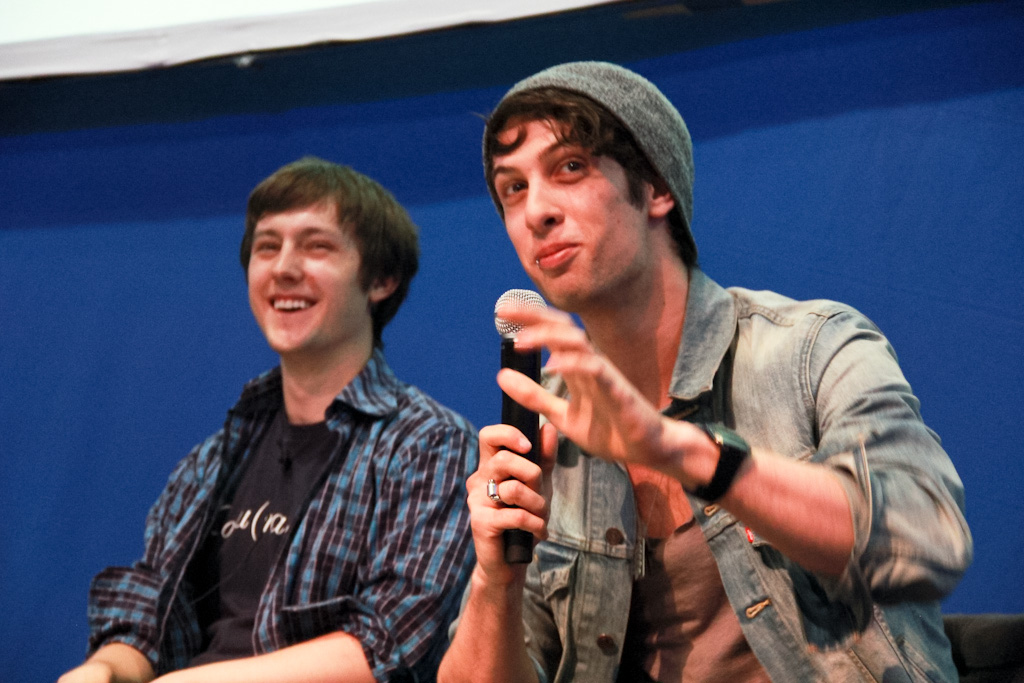
Ilya Zhitomirskiy and Daniel Grippi (2011)

The founders started the project after being motivated by a February 2010 speech of the Columbia University law professor Eben Moglen. In his speech, delivered to the Internet Society's New York Chapter, "Freedom in the Cloud", Moglen described centralized social networks as "spying for free." In an interview for The New York Times, Salzberg said "When you give up that data, you're giving it up forever ... The value they give us is negligible in the scale of what they are doing, and what we are giving up is all of our privacy." Sofaer said, "We don't need to hand our messages to a hub. What Facebook gives you as a user isn't all that hard to do. All the little games, the little walls, the little chat, aren't really rare things. The technology already exists".

The group decided to address this problem by creating a distributed social network. To obtain the necessary funds the project was launched on 24 April 2010 on Kickstarter, a crowd funding website. The first 39 days were assigned to raise the US$10,000 that they estimated would be needed to get started. However, the initial funding goal was met in just 12 days and the project eventually raised more than US$200,000 from more than 6000 backers (making it the second most successful Kickstarter project of its time). Grippi said, "We were shocked. For some strange reason, everyone just agreed with this whole privacy thing." Among the donors was Facebook CEO Mark Zuckerberg who contributed an undisclosed amount, saying "I donated. I think it is a cool idea."

"Diaspora is trying to destroy the idea that one network can be totally dominant," stated Sofaer in laying down the aim of Diaspora.

=== Early work and launch ===
Work on the Diaspora software began in May 2010. Finn Brunton, a teacher and digital media researcher at New York University, described their method as "a return of the classic geek means of production: pizza and ramen and guys sleeping under the desks because it is something that it is really exciting and challenging." A developer preview was released on 15 September and received criticism for various security flaws. The feedback of its users, however, led to quick improvements.

The first Diaspora "pod" was launched by the development team on 23 November 2010, as a private, invitation-only alpha test. A redesigned website was published in preparation for the alpha release, with the old site still available as a blog section. According to Terry Hancock of Free Software Magazine, September 2011, it was "already quite usable for some purposes". While it supported text, photographs, and links, it still lacked some features, including link preview, the ability to upload or embed videos (although videos could be linked to on other services) and chat. Animated GIFs were supported, however.

Since its release, features of Diaspora have appeared in similar forms in other social networks. In a September 2011 message, the developers noted similarities such as Google+'s "circles" (a version of Diaspora's aspects) and new sets of user privacy controls implemented by Facebook. They said "we can't help but be pleased with the impact our work has had". His supposition that Google borrowed heavily from Diaspora was a particular point of pride for Zhitomirskiy, although Google denied that Diaspora had influenced their designs.

In October 2011, Diaspora announced that it was starting a fundraising campaign. Maxwell Salzberg explained, "The key right now is to build something that our community wants to use and that makes a difference in our users' lives. In the future, we will work with our community to determine with them how we could best turn Diaspora* into a self-sustaining operation." Within days of commencing the campaign over US$45,000 had been raised when PayPal froze Diaspora's account without explanation. After a large number of complaints to PayPal from Diaspora users and the threat of legal action, the account was unfrozen with an apology from a PayPal executive, but still without explanation. This incident prompted the acceptance of other payment processors, including Stripe and Bitcoin.

The Diaspora Project website was started on 29 September 2011. Its declared mission is "to build a new and better social web, one that's 100% owned and controlled by you and other Diasporans."

=== Further development ===
On 12 November 2011 co-founder Zhitomirskiy committed suicide, at the age of twenty-two. Reports linked pressures related to Diaspora to his death. Zhitomirskiy's mother, Inna Zhitomirskiy, said, "I strongly believe that if Ilya did not start this project and stayed in school, he would be well and alive today." Diaspora co-founder Maxwell Salzberg disagreed. Salzberg stated, "Yes, I agree that being a startup founder is stressful. But it wasn't the stress of work that killed Ilya. He had his own issues. He was sick." Zhitomirskiy's mother, Inna Zhitomirskiy, did not comment on reports of his history of mental illness.

The beta stage was originally scheduled for November 2011, but was postponed due to the need to add new design features and also Zhitomirskiy's death. In February 2012, the developers indicated that they had completed work on the software back-end to improve both pod up-time and website response time. The next phase of work involved changes to the user interface and its associated terminology to reflect the way users are actually interacting, as the software moves towards beta status, anticipated for later on in 2012.

In February 2012, the developers wrote that their own research indicated a change in the focus for the project. They stated that, unlike other social networking websites, on which users mostly interact with people they know in real life, on Diaspora users mostly interact with people from all over the world whom they do not know. Whereas traditional social media mostly deals with user's trivial daily details, much of the traffic on Diaspora deals with ideas and social causes. As a result, the developers decided to make changes to the interface to better facilitate more lengthy and detailed conversations on complex subjects as the project progresses towards beta status.

By May 2012, development was underway to allow a high degree of customization of user posts, permitting users to post different media, such as text, photos and video with a high degree of personalization and individual expression. The developers felt that allowing individual creativity in posts would differentiate the Diaspora platform from competitors.

In June 2012, the development team was scheduled to move to Mountain View, California as part of work with startup accelerator Y Combinator. In August 2012 the developers focus changed to working on creating makr.io, as part of their YCombinator class.

In August 2012, the remaining founders formally handed the project over to its community. Since that date, Diaspora has been fully developed and managed by its community members. The focus of the community development team has been on creating stable software releases to act as a basis for further development, which included adopting a semantic versioning system for releases, improving the performance of data federation between pods, and enabling as many volunteers as possible to write code for the project. The project has also adopted the Loomio platform to enable democratic group decision-making.

In October 2012, the project made its first community release at 0.0.1.0, dropping all references to the Alpha/Beta branding it had previously used. At the same time development was moved to a development branch, leaving the master branch for stable releases.

Diaspora 0.9.0.0 was released on the 16th of June 2024. The main addition of this release was an API, allowing for the release of Insporation*, a Flutter based mobile app.

The latest version of Diaspora (0.9.1.0) was released in early 2026.

== Features ==
Diaspora is intended to address privacy concerns related to centralized social networks. It is constructed of a network of nodes, called pods, hosted by many different individuals and institutions. Each node operates a copy of the Diaspora software, which is a personal web server with social networking capabilities. Users of the network can host a pod on their own server or create an account on any existing pod of their choice. From that pod, they can interact with other users on all other pods. Diaspora users retain ownership of their data and do not assign ownership rights. The software is specifically designed to allow users to download all their images and text that have been uploaded at any time.

The developers consider the distributed nature of the network crucial to its design and success:

Diaspora's distributed design is a huge part of it. Like the Internet itself, Diaspora* isn't housed in any one place, and it's not controlled by any one entity (including us). We've created software that lets you set up and run your own social network on your own "pod" (or server) and connect your network to the larger Diaspora* ecosystem. You can have a pod all to yourself, or one for just you and your friends, or your family, giving you complete ownership and control over your personal social information (including your identity, your posts, and your photos) and how it's all stored and shared. Or you can simply ... sign up at one of [the] open pods.

The Diaspora software allows user posts to be designated as either "public" or "limited". In the latter case, posts may only be read by people assigned to one of the groups, termed aspects, which the user has approved to view the post. Each new account is assigned several default aspects – friends, family, work and acquaintances – and the user can add as many custom aspects as they like. It is possible to follow another user's public posts without the mutual friending required by other social networks. Users can also send private messages, called conversations. A user can filter their news stream by aspect.

Posts in Diaspora can include hashtags and "mentions" (a username preceded by an @ symbol). Users can upload photos to posts, and can format text and links using Markdown. Posts can be propagated to connected accounts on WordPress, Twitter and Tumblr. Diaspora supports embedding of media from YouTube, Vimeo and a number of other sites, and also supports OpenGraph previews. A key part of the original Diaspora software design concept was that it should act as a "social aggregator", allowing posts to be easily imported from Facebook, the pre-2018 Tumblr, and Twitter. As Village Voice writer Nick Pinto explained, "the idea is that this lowers the barriers to joining the network, and as more of your friends join, you no longer need to bounce communications through Facebook. Instead, you can communicate directly, securely, and without running exchanges past the prying eyes of Zuckerberg and his business associates." As of 2016, the API for this feature was still under discussion.

Friendica instances are also a part of the Diaspora social network since Friendica natively supports the Diaspora protocol.

== Reception ==
While the project was still in the alpha stage, it started getting noticed. In December 2010, ReadWriteWeb named the project as one of its Top 10 Start-Ups of 2010, saying "Diaspora certainly represents the power of crowd funding, as well as an interest in making sure the social Web is not centralized in one company". On 7 January 2011 Black Duck Software named the project one of its Open Source Rookies of 2010, for being "the privacy aware, personally controlled, do-it-all, open source social network". In July 2011, Konrad Lawson, blogging for the Chronicle of Higher Education, suggested Diaspora as an alternative to Facebook and Google+.

On 14 September 2011 Terry Hancock of Free Software Magazine endorsed the Diaspora network in an article entitled Why You Should Join Diaspora Now, Like Your Freedom Depends On It, calling it "good enough" for mainstream use. In explaining his reasoning for encouraging people to sign up he stated:

With all of the concerns over who controls the "Social Web" (We've addressed some of these problems before in Free Software Magazine) – regarding the Google+ name policy and other privacy issues, Facebook's questionable ethics, and the overall danger of controlled networks. I think it is extremely important for a more decentralized, more democratic, more open, and more free solution to succeed in the interest of personal freedom on the internet. And it looks to me like Diaspora is an essential part of that solution, so I'm endorsing it now, even though it's not entirely "ready".

On 14 November 2011 Suw Charman-Anderson wrote in firstpost.com, in connection to Zhitomirskiy's death, about why Diaspora's slower growth can be an advantage:

One key difference, however, is in number of users. Google+ has 40 million, whereas Diaspora has just 180,000 users [in 2011], in part because the service is still in alpha testing. This might actually work to Diaspora's advantage in the long run as it will have more time to build a sense of community. Experience shows us that online communities that grow too fast fragment and can become fractious as different groups clash over what kind of behaviour they think should be allowed.

Diaspora was nominated for "Best Social Network" in the 2011 Mashable.com Awards.

== Action against ISIS ==
The distributed design attracted members of the militant Islamist extremist group ISIS, in 2014, after their propaganda campaigns were censored by Twitter. Diaspora developers issued a statement urging users to report offensive content and helping pod admins to identify users' accounts associated with ISIS. Since the network is federated, there is no central point of control for blocking content. On 20 August 2014, the Diaspora Foundation stated that "all of the larger pods have removed the [ISIS]-related accounts and posts."

== See also ==
- Comparison of software and protocols for distributed social networking
- Data portability
- Mastodon (software)
- GNU social, a social network operating on the OStatus protocol
- Identi.ca, a distributed microblogging platform (does not accept new registrations)
- List of social networking websites
- Timeline of social media
