= OStatus =

Open microblogging protocol

- Communication protocol
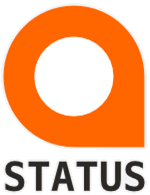
- Purpose: Decentralized social networking
- Influenced: ActivityPub
- Website: www.w3.org/community/ostatus/

OStatus is an open standard for decentralized social networking, allowing users on one service to send and receive status updates with users from another. The standard describes how a suite of various standards, including Atom, Activity Streams, WebSub, Salmon, and WebFinger, can be used together, which enables different microblogging server implementations to communicate status updates between their users back-and-forth, in near real-time.

== History ==
OStatus federation was first possible between servers running StatusNet, such as Status.net and Identi.ca, although Identi.ca later switched to pump.io. As of June 2013, a number of other microblogging applications and content management systems had announced that they intended to implement the standard. That same month, it was announced StatusNet would be merged into the GNU social project along with Free Social, a similar application itself forked from StatusNet.

Following the first official release of GNU Social, a number of microblogging sites running StatusNet and Free Social began to transition to it to receive new updates to the software. But frustrations with the technology underpinning GNU Social and its complexity led a number of new server packages that aimed to be compatible with GNU Social using OStatus to shift focus to ActivityPub, including Mastodon, Pleroma and postActiv, a fork of GNU social.

== Standards work ==
In January 2012, a W3C Community Group was opened to maintain and further develop the OStatus standard. However, this was eclipsed by the work of the W3C Federated Social Web Working Group, launched in July 2014. This working group focused on creating a newer standard, called ActivityPub, which expanded on the protocols and design used in pump.io, which has since been standardized as a successor to OStatus.

== Projects using OStatus ==
=== Current ===
- GNU social (formerly StatusNet)

=== Former ===
- Friendica
- Mastodon
- Pleroma

== See also ==
- OpenMicroBlogging – older federated microblogging specification, to be superseded by OStatus.
- Comparison of software and protocols for distributed social networking
- Comparison of microblogging and similar services
