= Ilya Zhitomirskiy =

American software developer and entrepreneur (1989–2011)

- Илья Житомирский
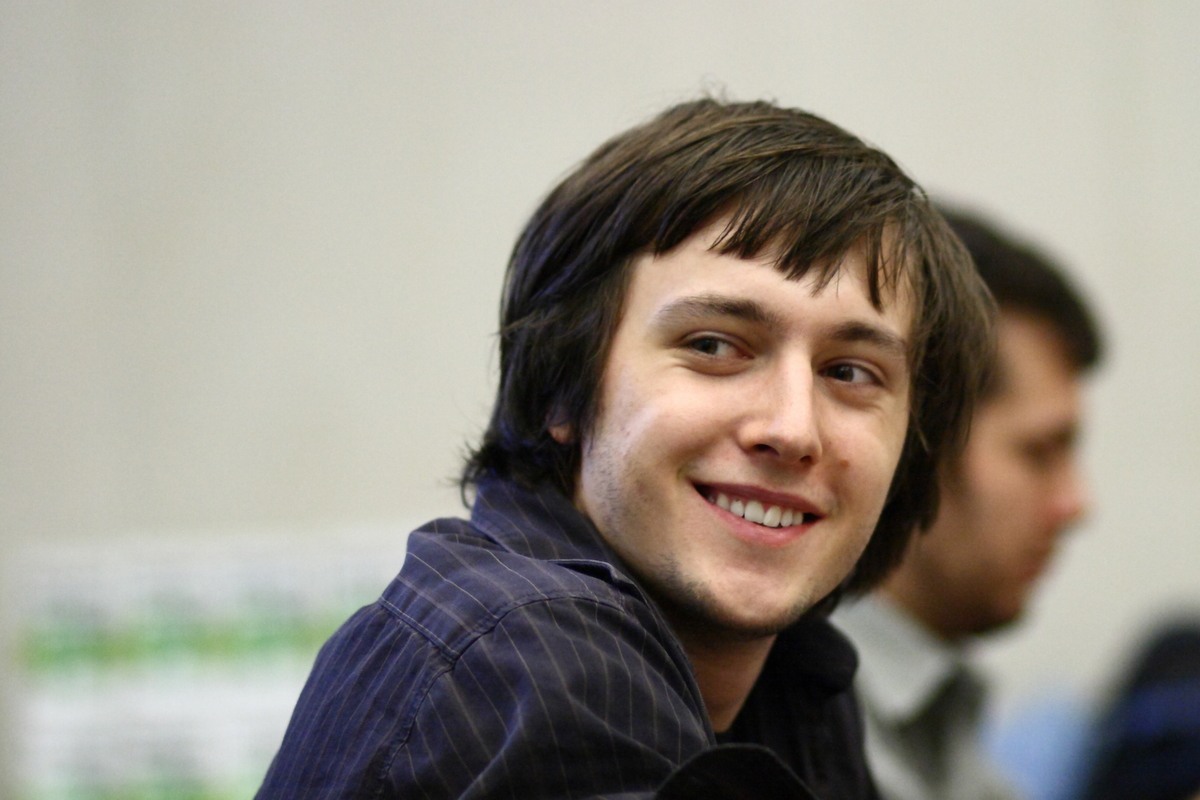
- Zhitomirskiy in 2009
- Born: 12 October 1989; Moscow, Russian SFSR, Soviet Union
- Died: 12 November 2011 (aged 22); San Francisco, California, U.S.
- Occupations: Software developer, entrepreneur
- Known for: Diaspora co-founder

Ilya Alekseyevich Zhitomirskiy (Russian: Илья Алексеевич Житомирский; 12 October 1989 – 12 November 2011) was an American software developer and entrepreneur. Zhitomirskiy was a co-founder and developer of the Diaspora social network and the Diaspora free software that powers it.

== Biography ==
=== Early life ===
Zhitomirskiy was born on 12 October 1989, in Moscow, Soviet Union, to Alexei Medovikov and Inna Zhitomirskaya. Both his father and maternal grandfather are mathematicians. In 2000, his family emigrated to the United States, eventually settling outside Philadelphia, where he graduated from Lower Merion High School in 2007. Zhitomirskiy first attended Acton-Boxborough Regional High School in Acton, Massachusetts. He then studied mathematics, economics and computer science at Tulane University, University of Maryland, and New York University. In his free time, Zhitomirskiy unicycled and was a competitive ballroom dancer.

=== Diaspora ===
At NYU, he studied computer science at The Courant Institute of Mathematical Sciences, where he met the three friends with whom he founded diaspora*, a social networking service, in 2010. The project was conceived after the founders had attended a lecture by Columbia Law School professor and free software activist Eben Moglen in February 2010 about the threat to privacy posed by commercial Internet services. According to Moglen, Zhitomirskiy was "immensely talented" and "the most idealistic of the group... He had a choice between graduate school and this project, and he chose to do the project because he wanted to do something with his time that would make freedom".

=== Death ===
On the evening of 12 November 2011, Zhitomirskiy was found dead in his San Francisco home by police responding to calls about a suspected suicide. An autopsy report from the Medical Examiner's office formally ruled the death as a suicide in April 2012. He died from an intentional inert gas asphyxiation using helium. While press reports questioned whether the pressure of working on Diaspora had led to his suicide, Diaspora co-founder Maxwell Salzberg disagreed. Salzberg stated, "Yes, I agree that being a startup founder is stressful. But it wasn’t the stress of work that killed Ilya. He had his own issues. He was sick." Zhitomirskiy’s mother, Inna Zhitomirskiy, did not comment on reports of his history of mental illness, but she did say on his participation in Diaspora, "I strongly believe that if Ilya did not start this project and stayed in school, he would be well and alive today."

The Village Voice said that Zhitomirskiy was "often described as the most idealistic and privacy-conscious member of the group" and declared his death "a devastating setback" for Diaspora.
