= Internet Brands =

American new media company in California

MH Sub I, LLC

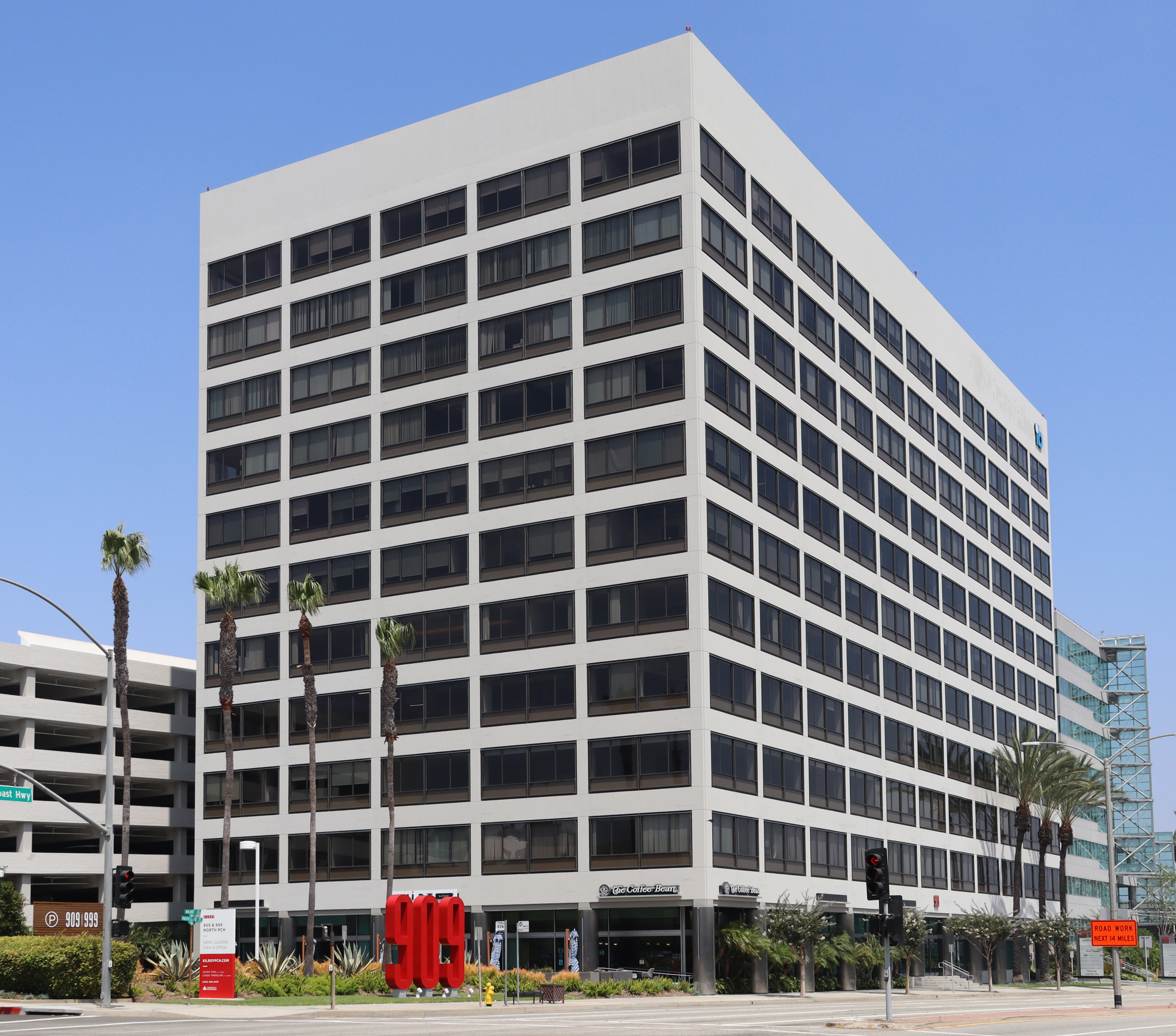
- Headquarters in El Segundo
- Trade name: Internet Brands
- Type: Private
- Traded as: Nasdaq: INET
- Industry: Internet media
- Founded: June 27, 1998; 28 years ago (as CarsDirect)
- Headquarters: El Segundo, California, U.S.
- Area served: Worldwide
- Key people: Robert Brisco (president) & CEO)
- Products: Consumer websites; software applications
- Owner: Kohlberg Kravis Roberts & Co. L.P.; Warburg Pincus; Temasek
- Website: www.internetbrands.com

MH Sub I, LLC d/b/a Internet Brands is a digital media, marketing services, and software company based in El Segundo, California, United States, that operates online media, community, e-commerce, and SaaS businesses in vertical markets. Its largest businesses are in online health and legal services. According to the company, they employ more than 7,000 people globally.

== Businesses ==
=== WebMD and Medscape ===
The company acquired its largest businesses, WebMD and Medscape, in a $2.8 billion transaction in 2017. In 2018, WebMD acquired Frontline Communications and Jobson. In 2019, WebMD acquired Aptus Health from Merck. In 2020, WebMD acquired: StayWell and Krames, also from Merck; and Germany-based Coliquio. In 2021, WebMD acquired ADDitude and the Wellness Network. In 2022, WebMD acquired Mercury Health Care, a spinout of Healthgrades. In 2022, WebMD acquired Jim.fr, a medical news and information website for physicians based in France. In 2023, Internet Brands acquired Limeade, a digital health and wellness platform, as well as Grupo Saned, a health and medical information services company in Spain. In 2024, WebMD acquired the operating assets of Healthwise, a provider of patient health education materials.

=== Legal Division ===
The company's legal division serves consumers and attorneys and includes FindLaw, Super Lawyers, Avvo, Martindale Hubbell, and Nolo. Its services and platforms for attorneys were collectively rebranded Martindale-Avvo in 2018. The company's Martindale Hubbell ownership originated in 2013 as a Joint Venture with LexisNexis, though the Martindale business traces its roots to 1868.

In October 2024, Thomson Reuters announced it would sell online legal information provider FindLaw to Internet Brands. The transaction was completed in December 2024.

=== PulsePoint ===
The company acquired PulsePoint (pulsepoint.com), a programmatic online ad tech company, in 2021.

=== Dental Division ===
Internet Brands and Henry Schein formed a joint venture in 2018, called Henry Schein One (HS1), contributing the dental software and internet businesses of both companies. In 2019, HS1 acquired Lighthouse 360. In 2020, HS1 acquired United Kingdom-based Dentally. In 2021, HS1 acquired Jarvis Analytics.

=== Consumer Internet division ===
In 2007, the company acquired Corvette Forum and in 2004, a Chevy Corvette enthusiast site.

As of its 2009 public filings, the consumer internet division owned and operated more than 95 websites in seven categories and attracted more than 62 million unique visitors per month, with 97% of the audience originating from organic, non-paid sources. The company's strategy is to focus on specific target audiences that tend to be attractive to advertisers.

On December 1, 2010, Internet Brands acquired AllLaw.com and AttorneyLocate.com, both founded by Arvind A. Raichur.

In 2016, the company acquired Fodor's travel, which was joined with other travel properties such as Wikitravel and FlyerTalk.

SEC filings indicate that approximately 70% of the company's revenues are derived from advertising from more than 40,000 accounts—most of them small and medium enterprises.

The company's portfolio of websites include many with social media features: social network services, user generated content, blogs, wikis, and internet forums.

== History ==
The company was founded in 1998 as CarsDirect.com, launched from the business incubator Idealab. The company invented a consumer-advocacy approach to selling cars "haggle-free" online, an approach it continues to employ. In 2000, Roger Penske invested in the company and joined the Board of Directors. That same year, the company was the title sponsor of the 2000 CarsDirect.com 400, an event in the NASCAR Winston Cup Series, to bring attention to online car buying. In 2002, Time Magazine voted the site one of the 50 best in the world.

The company changed its name to Internet Brands in 2005. The company's IPO was in November 2007 on the NASDAQ exchange. INET was added to the NASDAQ Internet Index on March 22, 2010.

Internet Brands agreed to be acquired for $640 million by the private equity firm Hellman & Friedman in September 2010 and was thus delisted from NASDAQ.

Between September 2012 and February 2013, Internet Brands was involved in a legal battle with the Wikimedia Foundation (the operators of Wikipedia) over the new competitor to Wikitravel called Wikivoyage which was started by a number of former contributors to Wikitravel.

Internet Brands was acquired in June 2014 by KKR from Hellman & Friedman for 1.1 billion dollars. KKR is making its investment in partnership with Internet Brands chief executive officer Bob Brisco and the Internet Brands management team, who will hold a minority stake in the company and continue to run the business.

In January 2016, Intuit Inc. announced an agreement to sell Demandforce to Internet Brands.

== Controversies ==
=== vBulletin criticism ===
In October 2009, Internet Brands changed the pricing structure for its vBulletin software, prompting complaints from registered users on the official forums. According to The Register those who complained were then banned from both the forums and from receiving support and updates, despite still having valid licences for the product. Internet Brands defended their position to The Register in a separate article; however, a later update to the same article stated that at least some of Internet Brands' claims were false. In October 2010, Internet Brands announced that it would file a lawsuit against the XenForo team claiming copyright infringement; specifically that code in XenForo was based on vBulletin code, breach of contract, and engaging in unfair business practices. In November 2010, Internet Brands sued Kier Darby, a lead developer of XenForo, who had previously served as a lead developer for Internet Brands' vBulletin, claiming that Kier had not returned confidential information from Internet Brands regarding the vBulletin software. The XenForo team has denied the claims. In February 2013, the lawsuit was dismissed.

=== Wikitravel and Wikimedia ===
In 2012, after a lengthy history of dissatisfaction, community members at Internet Brands-owned website Wikitravel began discussing whether to fork (split off) of their work and editing activities from Wikitravel and recommence their editing activities at another website host. The dissatisfaction related to long standing discontent at poor hosting, poor site updates, and excessive over-monetarization and advertising, and eventually, interference by Internet Brands in the community's activities in breach of prior agreements and understandings.

Forking is a normal or anticipated activity in wiki communities and is permitted by the Creative Commons license in use on sites such as Wikitravel, and the wiki software used by Wikitravel included the facility to take 'database "dumps"' for that purpose. This mirrored the fork of the German and Italian language Wikitravel communities some years earlier, which led to a new travel wiki site called Wikivoyage. Members of the communities concerned decided that the community at Wikitravel would move its editing efforts to merge with Wikivoyage, to create a new travel wiki to be hosted by the Wikimedia Foundation, the owner of Wikipedia and a large range of other non-profit reference sites based upon a wiki community.

The merge and move were endorsed by the editing community, but opposed by Internet Brands who litigated against two users it accused of unlawful actions related to the proposal. The allegations were strongly rejected by the individuals and the (non-party) Wikimedia Foundation who stated the case was an example of a SLAPP lawsuit intended to deter and frustrate lawful conduct. On November 19, 2012, the claims by Internet Brands were dismissed by the United States District Court for the Central District of California.

=== Greenlight Financial Services ===
In April 2013, on behalf of its client Greenlight Financial Services, Inc., the Rhema Law Group won a jury verdict trial against Internet Brands, Inc. The Orange County Superior Court jury found that Internet Brands breached a previous settlement agreement between the parties and awarded lost profits damages in the amount of $750,000.

=== Model Mayhem ===
ModelMayhem.com is a social media website where models can create profiles and publish pictures. In May 2008, Internet Brands bought Model Mayhem from the original developers Donald and Tyler Waitt. Model Mayhem was involved in the court case Jane Doe No. 14 v. Internet Brands, Inc., where litigants argued that Model Mayhem was liable for damages resulting from crimes committed by users on the website.
