= Identi.ca =

Open source social networking and micro-blogging service

identi.ca

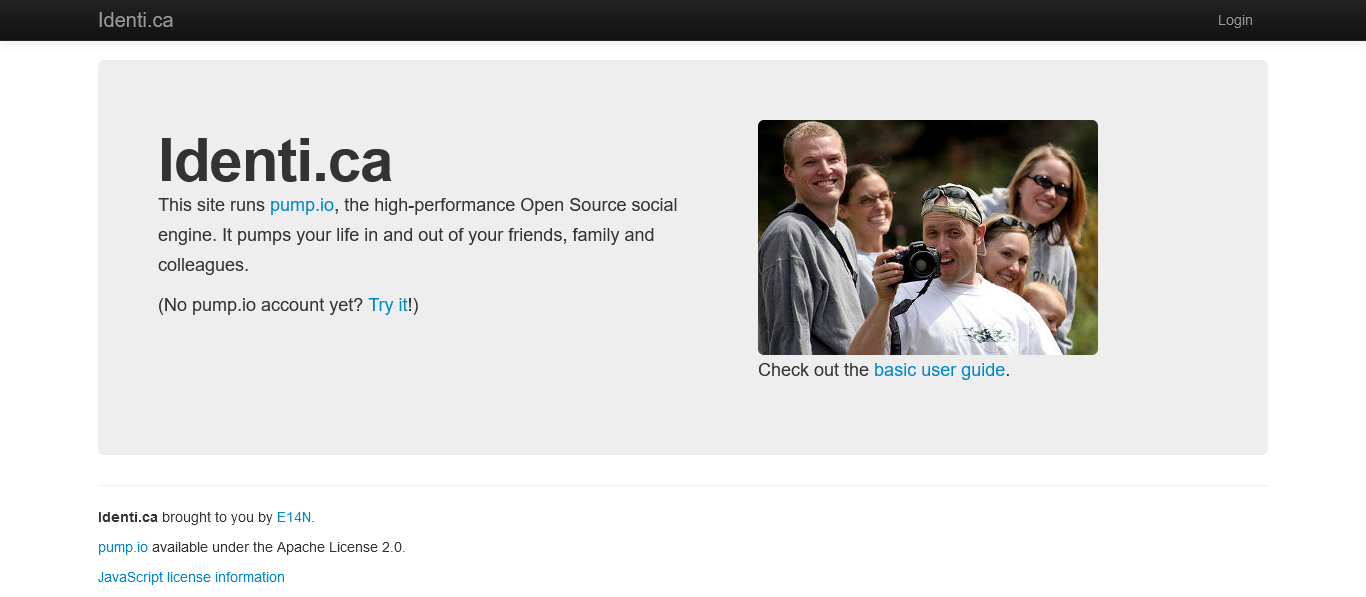
- Screenshot of identi.ca when logged out
- Website type: Microblogging and Social network service
- Available in: English
- Owner: E14N.com
- Creator: Evan Prodromou
- Website: identi.ca
- Commercial: Yes
- Registration: Required to post
- Launched: July 2, 2008; 18 years ago
- Current status: New user registration disabled
- Content license: Creative Commons Attribution 3.0
- Written in: JavaScript

identi.ca is a free and open-source social networking and blogging service based on the pump.io software, using the Activity Streams protocol. Identi.ca stopped accepting new registrations in 2013, but continues to operate alongside several other pump.io-based hosts provided by E14N which continue to accept new registrations.

== Features ==
Identi.ca is similar to social networking sites like Facebook and Google+, allowing unlimited length status updates, rich text, and images. The Activity Streams protocol supports many kinds of activities such as games. OpenFarmGame is a prototype application for an Activity Streams-based game. Previous features from its StatusNet version such as hashtags, groups, and global search are not supported.

== History ==
=== StatusNet ===
The service received more than 8,000 registrations and 19,000 updates within the first 24 hours of publicly launching on July 2, 2008, and reached its 1,000,000th notice on November 4, 2008. In January 2009, identi.ca received investment funds from venture capital group Montreal Start Up.

On March 30, 2009, Control Yourself (since renamed StatusNet Inc) announced that Identi.ca was to become part of a hosted microblogging service called status.net to be launched in May 2009. Status.net offers individual microblogs under a subdomain to be chosen by the customer. Identi.ca will remain a free service. All notices will be published under the Creative Commons Attribution 3.0 license by default, but paying customers will be free to choose a different license.

Formerly based on StatusNet, a micro-blogging software package built on the OStatus specification (and earlier based on the OpenMicroBlogging specification), Identi.ca allowed users to send text updates (known as "notices") up to 140 characters long. While similar to Twitter in both concept and operation, Identi.ca/StatusNet provided many features not currently implemented by Twitter, including XMPP support and personal tag clouds. In addition, Identi.ca/StatusNet allowed free export and exchange of personal and "friend" data based on the FOAF standard; therefore, notices could be fed into a Twitter account or other service, and also ported in to a private system similar to Yammer.

=== pump.io ===
Developer Evan Prodromou chose to change the site to the pump.io software platform in development, because pump.io offers more features making it technically more advanced. Registration on Identi.ca was closed in December 2012 in preparation for the switch to pump.io software (the popularity of Identi.ca and "official" Status.net hosting were considered a hindrance to the creation of a federated social network). The conversion was completed on 12 July 2013.

The 140 character per post limit was removed (in StatusNet, it was a setting, not an inherent limitation); now the blog posts can contain formatting and images. Groups, hashtags, and a page listing popular posts are not yet implemented in pump.io.

== See also ==
- Comparison of microblogging services
