= Evan Prodromou =

American software developer and open source advocate

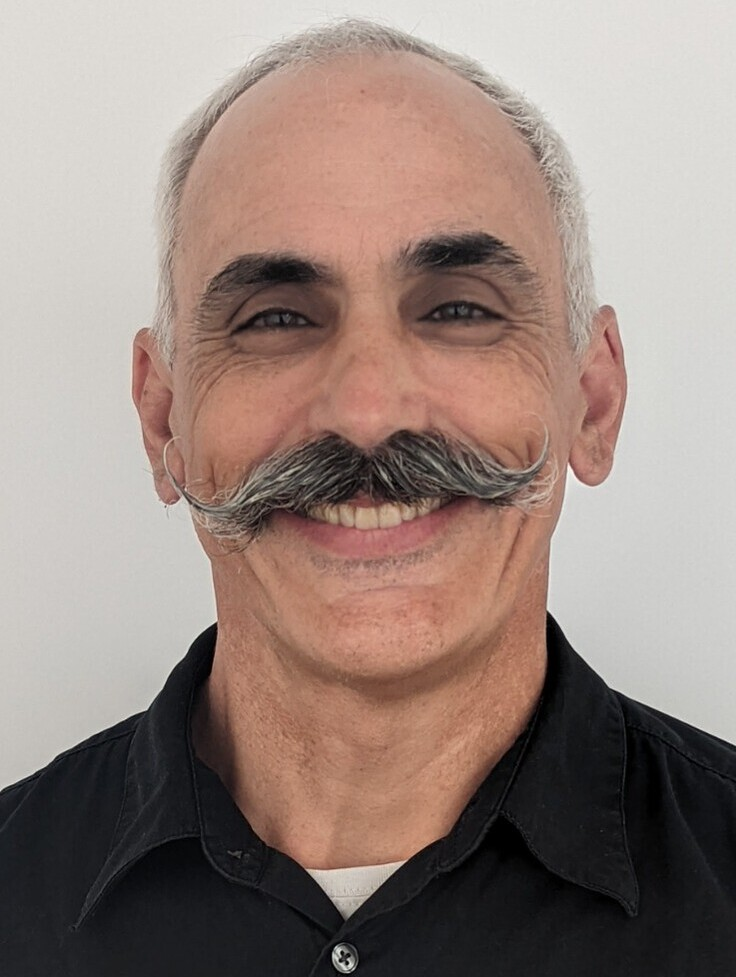
- Prodromou in 2023
- Born: 14 October 1968 (age 58); Cincinnati, Ohio
- Spouse: Michele Ann Jenkins
- Prodromou's voice recorded August 2017

Evan S. Prodromou (born 14 October 1968) is a software developer and open source advocate. He is a co-editor of ActivityPub, the W3C standard for decentralized social networking used by platforms such as Mastodon.

His other major contributions have been Wikitravel (with Michele Ann Jenkins), Identi.ca, and StatusNet, and Fuzzy.ai, an artificial intelligence service for developers.

== Biography ==
Prodromou was born in Cincinnati, Ohio, United States, and grew up in Texas and California. He has lived in Amsterdam, San Francisco, and Lisbon, and currently lives in Montreal, Canada.

Prodromou graduated from University of California, Berkeley in 1990 (Physics, English), and worked for Microsoft and various Web development companies in the late 1990s. In 2003 he started Wikitravel, and in 2007 founded Control Yourself, which developed the software for Identi.ca, a microblogging service. Control Yourself was renamed to Laconica, StatusNet in 2010, and finally to GNU social in 2012. In December 2012 Prodromou started a new company, E14N.com, to develop a new social media platform, Pump.io, a follow-up to StatusNet.

Prodromou is an advocate of Free and Open Source Software and free culture. He has presented at software conferences, and is the chair of the World Wide Web consortium's (W3C) Federated Social Web Community Group.

Evan is the son of Stav Prodromou, and is married to Michele Ann Jenkins. They have two children.

== Projects ==
Evan Prodromou is working on or has worked on these projects:

- https://www.openearth.org/
- fuzzy.ai
- Breather (company)
- Pump.io
- E14N.com (formerly Control Yourself, Laconica, and StatusNet)
- Identi.ca
- Wikitravel
- Vinismo
- kei.ki
- certifi.ca
- Heat.net
- AuthXML a forbearer of SAML

== Publications ==
- Prodromou, Evan (2024). ActivityPub. O'Reilly Media, Inc. ISBN 9781098169466.
