= Activity stream =

List of recent activities performed by an individual, typically on a single website

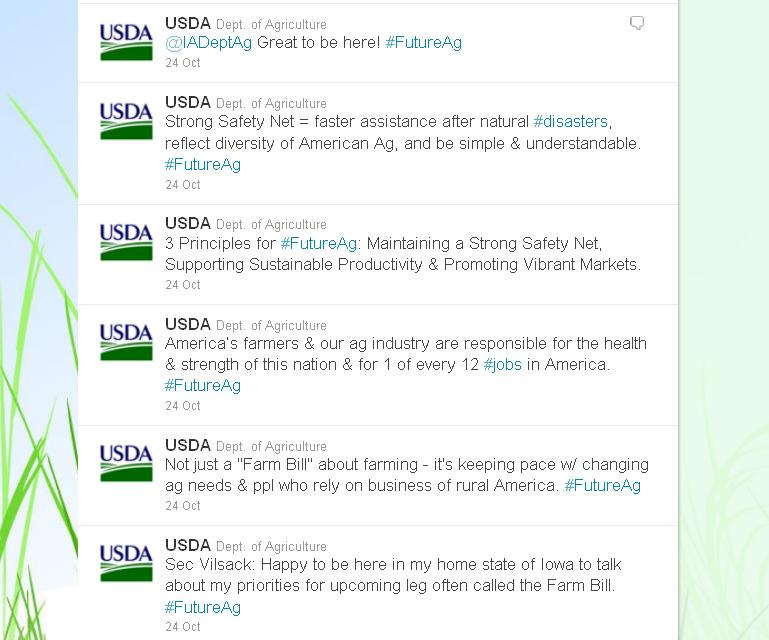
A stream of Twitter posts from the U.S. Department of Agriculture

An activity stream is a list of recent activities performed by an individual, typically on a single website. For example, Facebook's News Feed is an activity stream. Since the introduction of the News Feed on September 6, 2006, other major websites have introduced similar implementations for their own users. Since the proliferation of activity streams on websites, there have been calls to standardize the format so that websites could interact with a stream provided by another website. The Activity Streams project, for example, is an effort to develop an activity stream protocol to syndicate activities across social web applications. Several major websites with activity stream implementations have already opened up their activity streams to developers to use, including Facebook and MySpace.

Though activity stream arises from social networking, nowadays it has become an essential part of business software. Enterprise social software is used in different types of companies to organize their internal communication and acts as an addition to traditional corporate intranet. Collaboration software like Jive Software, Yammer, and Chatter offer activity stream as a separate product. At the same time other software providers such as tibbr, Central Desktop, and Wrike offer activity stream as an integrated part of their collaboration software solution.

Activity streams come in two different variations:

- Generic feeds: all users see the same content in the activity stream.
- Personalised feeds: each user gets bespoke items as well as custom ranking of each element in the feed.

== Notable sites with activity streams ==
- Facebook's News Feed
- Gnip
- Salesforce.com's Chatter
- Traction TeamPage Release 5.0 adds activity streams to Enterprise 2.0 social software platform
- Twitter
- Tumblr
- Snapchat
- Spotify
- Pinterest

== Notable software ==
- Eureka Streams
- Ektron CMS400.NET Release 8.0 adds activity streams to its social software suite

== See also ==
- Distributed social network
- OpenSocial
- Social networking service
