= Nolo (publisher) =

Book of Nolo

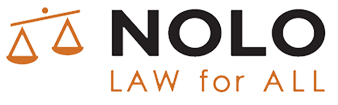
- Parent company: Internet Brands
- Founded: 1971; 55 years ago
- Founders: Charles (Ed) Sherman and Ralph (Jake) Warner
- Country of origin: United States
- Headquarters location: Berkeley, California
- Distribution: Ingram Publisher Services
- Key people: Ralph Warner, Chairman; Chris Braun, President
- Publication types: Books, Software, eBooks, Legal Forms, Online Services, Articles
- Nonfiction topics: Law, business, nonprofits, personal finance, estate planning, employment law, family law
- Official website: nolo.com/about/about.html

Nolo, formerly known as Nolo Press, is a publisher in Berkeley, California, that produces do-it-yourself legal books and software that allows people to handle simple legal matters such as making wills or writing business partnership contracts. Its areas of focus include immigration, family law, employment law, tenant and landlord issues, wills, trusts and intellectual property. Even though Nolo encourages consumers and small business owners to handle their own legal matters when it is reasonably feasible to do so, the company recommends getting professional legal help for disputable or difficult matters.

The company was founded in an attic in 1971 by Ralph Warner (a graduate of UC Berkeley's Boalt School of Law) and family law attorney Ed Sherman. The company's logo shows the scales of justice tilted in favor of the reader, and includes the motto "LAW for ALL."

== History ==
In 1971 Ed Sherman wrote How to Do Your Own Divorce in California. He and Ralph Warner discovered that established publishers wouldn't publish the book because they feared being prosecuted for practicing law without a licence. In response Sherman and Warner created Nolo Press and published it themselves. They then started publishing additional do-it-yourself legal guides under the Nolo Press name.

The Latin word "nolo" in the original company name ("Nolo Press") could be taken to mean "I would prefer not to." Warner and Sherman thought this name was appropriate since they had only started a publishing business themselves after their first do-it-yourself guide was turned down by established publishers.

In 2006, Nolo began publishing a directory of attorneys, which is asserted to operate on the principle that both participating lawyers and consumers are better served by a relatively short list of qualified attorneys under each category (business law, real estate, etc.), with much information for side-by-side comparisons.

In 2006 Nolo retired its unofficial shark mascot on the company's 35th anniversary. Some older Nolo publications had featured the shark wearing a necktie and carrying a briefcase – showing the company's fondness for poking fun at their fellow members of the legal profession. This mascot was often accompanied by the motto "Don't feed the lawyers. Just say Nolo."

In 2011, the company was purchased by Internet Brands, Inc.

Ed Sherman founded his own legal publishing business, Nolo Press Occidental, a separate company from Nolo.

== Products and services ==
Since its inception in the early 1970s, Nolo's primary focus has been publishing self-help legal guides designed to assist anyone in finding plain-language answers to common legal questions. The company is also the creator of Quicken WillMaker software, which allows individuals to create do-it-yourself wills, powers of attorney and other estate planning documents.

== Complaints from lawyers ==
Although the company's products conspicuously recommend the reader to engage a lawyer for difficult or contended matters, the company has nevertheless drawn the ire of some legal organizations.

Publication of Nolo's first book, How to Do Your Own Divorce in California, was condemned by the Sacramento Bar Association, which led to a huge increase in its sales.

In 1997, the Texas Unauthorized Practice of Law Committee (a committee of the Texas Supreme Court) opened investigations on Nolo and similar publishers, inquiring as to whether their publications constituted practicing law without a license. Saying that the investigation was "the first step toward widespread state censorship", Nolo sued, seeking a declaratory judgment that its publications were legal. It was joined in the action by the American Association of Law Libraries and the Texas Library Association. In response, the Texas Legislature enacted HR 1507, which expressly exempted websites and textbooks from accusations of practicing law without a license, providing they "clearly and conspicuously state that the products are not a substitute for the advice of an attorney". In light of this, the court committee dropped its contest of Nolo's suit.
