= GNU social =

Microblogging social networking service

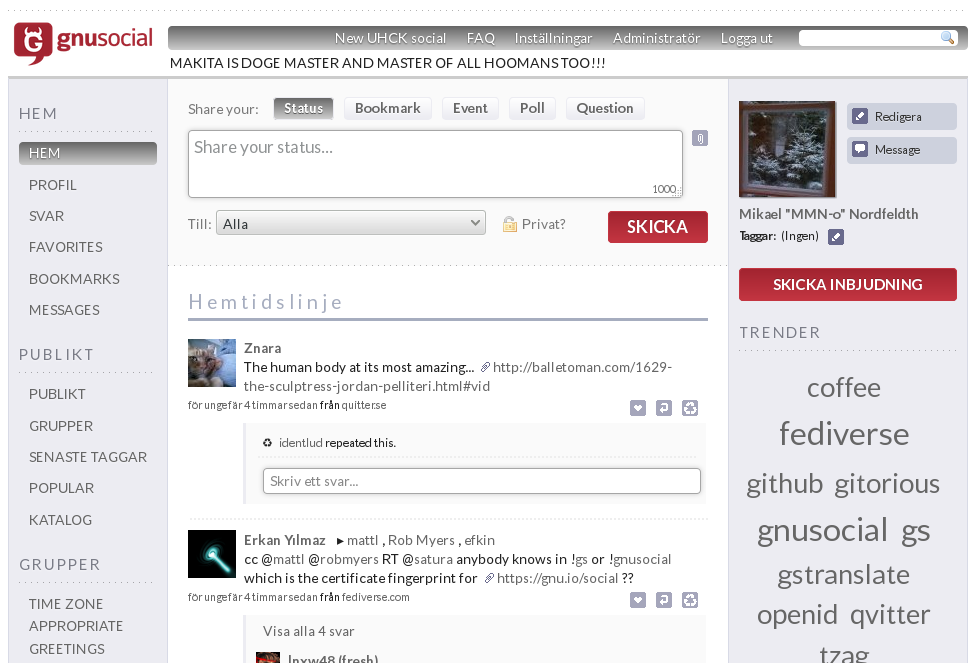
- Screenshot of a GNU social website with Swedish localization
- Original author: Evan Prodromou et al.
- Developers: Diogo Cordeiro and GNU social Developers
- Final release: 1.20.9 / 22 June 2019
- Preview release: 2.0.0beta0 / 18 July 2021
- Written in: PHP
- Operating system: Cross-platform
- Available in: More than 25 languages
- Type: Social networking service
- License: AGPL-3.0-or-later
- Website: gnusocial.rocks
- Repository: codeberg.org/GNUsocial/gnu-social

GNU social (and its predecessor StatusNet) is a largely defunct free and open-source microblogging social networking service that implements the OStatus and ActivityPub standards for interoperability between installations. While offering similar functionality to social networks such as Twitter, GNU social seeks to provide the ability for open and federated communication between different microblogging communities, known as 'instances'. Both enterprises and individuals can install and control their own instances and user data.

At its peak in popularity, GNU social had been deployed on hundreds of interconnected instances, however has since fallen into disuse as competing software like Mastodon and Pleroma have taken its position as the dominant federated microblogging services. Later on in its lifespan, the project split into two separate branches, with "v2" being a continuation of the original codebase for maintenance of existing instances, with "v3" being a complete redesign of the project meant to integrate further ActivityPub support and modernization of the user experience and its technological back-end. As of August 15, 2022, there had been no new commits to the v2 branch, with the v3 branch also no longer being actively developed not long after by November 25, 2022, with the project essentially abandoned.

Despite its modern obsolescence and dated design compared to modern platforms, GNU social and StatusNet is regarded to be the origin of the Fediverse network and has had a major influence on the design of more modern decentralized social networks that succeeded it.

== History ==
While being the main project within its lineage, GNU social originally began as a fork of StatusNet. The software was first developed for a service called identi.ca from Evan Prodromou, which offered free microblogging accounts to the public. The software quickly became one of the first popular examples of a decentralized social network, as identi.ca allowed any other server that was running the software to communicate with it, something which had not previously been attempted before in social media at such a large scale.

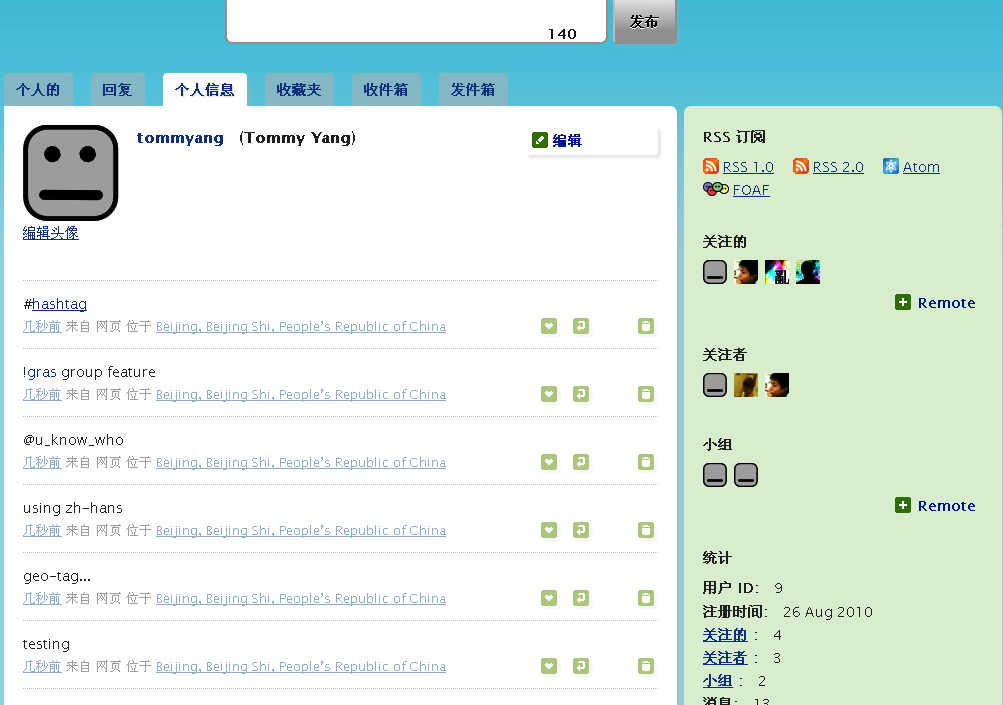
The original StatusNet user interface

=== StatusNet ===
Originally, StatusNet (named Laconica at the time) was launched with a communication protocol designed specifically for the project called OpenMicroBlogging (OMB). With version 0.8.1, the name of the software was changed to StatusNet. Version 0.9.0 was released soon after on March 3, 2010, with the developers implementing a newly designed protocol dubbed OStatus, with support for OMB being dropped not long after. Compared to OpenMicroBlogging, OStatus could handle and federate more events and actions than the basic plaintext communication that OMB provided and was based on a variety of other web technologies, allowing for easier adoption of new implementations of the protocol for servers and clients compared to the fully custom architecture of OMB.

With the StatusNet name change, the company developing both the software and OStatus as well as managing identi.ca rebranded from Control Yourself to StatusNet Inc. In August 2010, the company raised a new round of venture capital funds to establish a hosting service under the status.net domain from sources such as First Mark Capital, BOLDstart Ventures, iNovia Capital and Montreal Start Up, raising over $2.3 million in funding up to that point. The hosting service allowed anyone to establish their own StatusNet instance without maintaining a server, similar to WordPress.com and other blogging platforms.

New registrations on identi.ca along with the ability to create new status.net instances was disabled in December 2012, in preparation for a migration to pump.io that has since been named by users of StatusNet and OStatus as "the Pumpocalypse". pump.io was a brand new software package like StatusNet, but with a new protocol designed for general purpose activity streams outside of microblogging and ease-of-use for developers building on the technology, much like the transition from OMB to OStatus. The announcement was seen as unexpected among identi.ca users, who were concerned about the possibility of their statuses being deleted with the transition. At the same time, server administrators running third-party instances and their users who were left behind on StatusNet were also worried, as it was unclear at the time whether future development of the software would be picked up by a new maintainer. The transition for identi.ca users to pump.io was completed on 12 July 2013.

==== Previous names ====
The original name of StatusNet was Laconica, a reference to the Laconic phrase; a particularly brief statement commonly attributed to the leaders of Sparta (Laconia being the Greek region containing Sparta). In microblogging, all messages are designed to be very short due to the traditional 140-character limit on message size, a limitation imported from SMS.

Beginning with version 0.8.1, the name was changed to StatusNet. The developers said that the new name "simply reflects what our software does: send status updates into your social network."

=== GNU social ===
GNU social originally began as a side project of GNU FM (Libre.fm) maintainer Matt Lee, with the goal of being able to federate messages between Last.fm and other instances of GNU FM using StatusNet plugins. Around the same time, a developer named Mikael Nordfeldth forked StatusNet with the intention of maintaining it as a personal project, dubbing it "Free Social". However, following identi.ca's transition to pump.io and its developers' sudden abandonment of StatusNet, the projects received more attention from server administrators and other users looking for an actively updated alternative.

Shortly after LibrePlanet 2012, a plan was formed to merge all three projects into a single service. On June 8, 2013, it was announced that along with Free Social, StatusNet would be merged into the GNU social project and stewarded by the Free Software Foundation, with the project since becoming the dominant variant of StatusNet.

During GNU social's lifespan, a popular theme for the user interface named Quitter was used, which was similar to an earlier Twitter interface. Many instances were made specifically using the name Quitter such as Quitter.se, an instance created by the developer of the theme. Before the establishment of Mastodon's popularity and dominance within the network, Quitter was noted as a frequent location for users of Twitter to migrate to when users disagreed with moderation policies or feature updates, such as when an algorithmic feed was added to Twitter.

A fork of GNU social was made called postActiv, which planned to rewrite the backend and user interface of GNU social, as well as to add compatibility for Diaspora's protocol.

== Features ==
A basic GNU social instance takes the form of a microblogging service with a reverse chronological timeline that features status updates and small messages from followed accounts, similar to other services such as Twitter or Weibo. While users could see their own customized timeline, they could access another timeline that showcased every message that the instance knows of, including from other instances that were connected to each other if someone on the instance followed an account from it. Users could also create and join groups, which allows for discussion and collaboration on specific topics.

Administrators can also customize their server via the plugin system, which allows developers to create new features or modify existing plugins to suit the needs of the instance via PHP. A notable plugin built for GNU social was Quitter, a revamp of the user interface that resembles an earlier version of Twitter's user interface.

== See also ==
- Comparison of microblogging services
- Comparison of software and protocols for distributed social networking
- diaspora*, a similar contemporary decentralized social network
- identi.ca
- pump.io

== Further information ==
- Building a Better Twitter: A Study of the Twitter Alternatives GNU Social, Quitter, rstat.us, and Twister (2015)
