= CorvetteForum =

American car enthusiast website

- Founded: 1999
- Headquarters: El Segundo, California, {{{location_country}}}
- Parent: Internet Brands
- Website: www.corvetteforum.com

Corvette Forum is an auto enthusiast website for owners and fans of the Chevrolet Corvette sports car.

== History ==
The Corvette Forum was launched in 1999 by Troy Roberts and Ryan Adams, two Corvette enthusiasts. The site is not directly affiliated with General Motors.

The site had 110,000 registered members by 2006. In July 2009, memberships numbered 220,000, and the site's discussion forum contained more than 30 million posts, according to the site's discussion forum home page.

CorvetteForum was acquired by Internet Brands in 2007.

== Site Usage ==
Topics include restoration tips, service and repair advice, aftermarket product discussions, and Corvette news.

Discussions cover Corvettes of every year and model, ranging from the first Corvettes produced in 1953 to current models and speculation about future models. Corvette discussion is very restricted. As per their guidelines, “linking to other Corvette sites is not permitted. Neither is linking to non-supporting vendors or other commercial sites”. The site also includes a small online marketplace.

The group used to hold a "Cruise In" at the National Corvette Museum in Bowling Green, Kentucky, for an annual meet-up event that raised money for the museum. The "Cruise In" was cancelled after the last cruise was held in 2010 when the forum administrator chose St. Jude's over the National Corvette Museum as its charity of choice.

== Charitable Causes ==
CorvetteForum has held an annual fund raiser to support St. Jude Children's Research Hospital since 2003. The community has raised a total of $854,601 as of 2015.

Year	Amount Raised
2003	$23,500
2004	$23,800
2005	$38,000
2006	$61,000
2007	$75,000
2008	$100,500
2009	$100,501
2010	$77,600
2011	$80,304
2012	$70,101
2013	$101,835
2014	$102,460
