= List of content forks of Wikipedia =

Wikipedia's free content licenses, and a culture that includes a "right to fork", have led to content forks of the open-source encyclopedia. This is different from online encyclopedias that make use of Wikipedia's development model and MediaWiki software to develop their content from scratch.

== Active forks ==
- Grokipedia, a 2025 AI-generated encyclopedia—developed by xAI—which makes widespread uses of forked Wikipedia articles.
- Qiuwen Baike, a 2023 fork of the Chinese Wikipedia that aims to be compliant with Chinese government policies.
- Ruwiki, a 2023 fork of the Russian Wikipedia that aims to be compliant with Russian government policies.

== Defunct forks ==
- Citizendium, was a 2006 fork of English Wikipedia, founded by Wikipedia co-founder Larry Sanger, which was unforked in 2007.
- Enciclopedia Libre, was a 2002 fork of the Spanish Wikipedia created in opposition to perceived plans to add advertising to Wikipedia.
- Everipedia, was a 2015 fork of English Wikipedia, which was later unforked.
- WikiPilipinas, was a 2007 fork of a set Philippine-related articles from English Wikipedia which is no longer active.

== See also ==
- List of online encyclopedias
- List of wikis
- Wikitravel and Wikivoyage
