= Wikitravel =

Web-based collaborative travel guide

- The Wikitravel logo includes a stylized blue-grey compass rose.
- Website type: Wiki travel guide with media repository
- Available in: Initially English, now also 20 other languages: Arabic, Catalan, Chinese, Dutch, Esperanto, Finnish, French, German, Hebrew, Hindi, Hungarian, Italian, Japanese, Korean, Polish, Portuguese, Romanian, Russian, Spanish, Swedish
- Owner: Internet Brands
- Creators: Evan Prodromou; Michele Ann Jenkins
- Website: wikitravel.org
- Commercial: Yes
- Registration: Optional
- Launched: July 2003; 23 years ago
- Current status: Active
- Content license: CC BY-SA
- Written in: MediaWiki software, made in PHP

Wikitravel is a web-based collaborative travel guide based on the wiki format and owned by Internet Brands. It was most active from 2003 through 2012, when most of its editing community left and brought their contributions to the nonprofit Wikivoyage guide.

The site was launched by Evan Prodromou and Michele Ann Jenkins in 2003 as a multilingual effort aiming to cover all the globe's destinations. In 2005, Internet Brands bought the brand for $1.7 million from its founders. They later introduced advertising to the website. This move met opposition from users, with many German and Italian editors leaving in December 2006 for a newly established wiki, Wikivoyage that would be non-commercial.

In 2006, Wikitravel launched a free media repository known as Wikitravel Shared, and in 2007, it received a Webby Award for Best Travel Website. The same year, Wikitravel's founders and Jani Patokallio began Wikitravel Press, a project that first published printed travel guides in February 2008 based on the website's content, but shut down in 2011.

In 2012, in response to sustained dissatisfaction with Internet Brands' commercialization and technical support, a large portion of the editing community, including the founders, left and transferred their contributions to the Wikivoyage travel guide, which was relaunched as a Wikimedia Foundation–hosted project in January 2013. By 2018, Wikivoyage had surpassed Wikitravel in edit count and page count.

== History ==
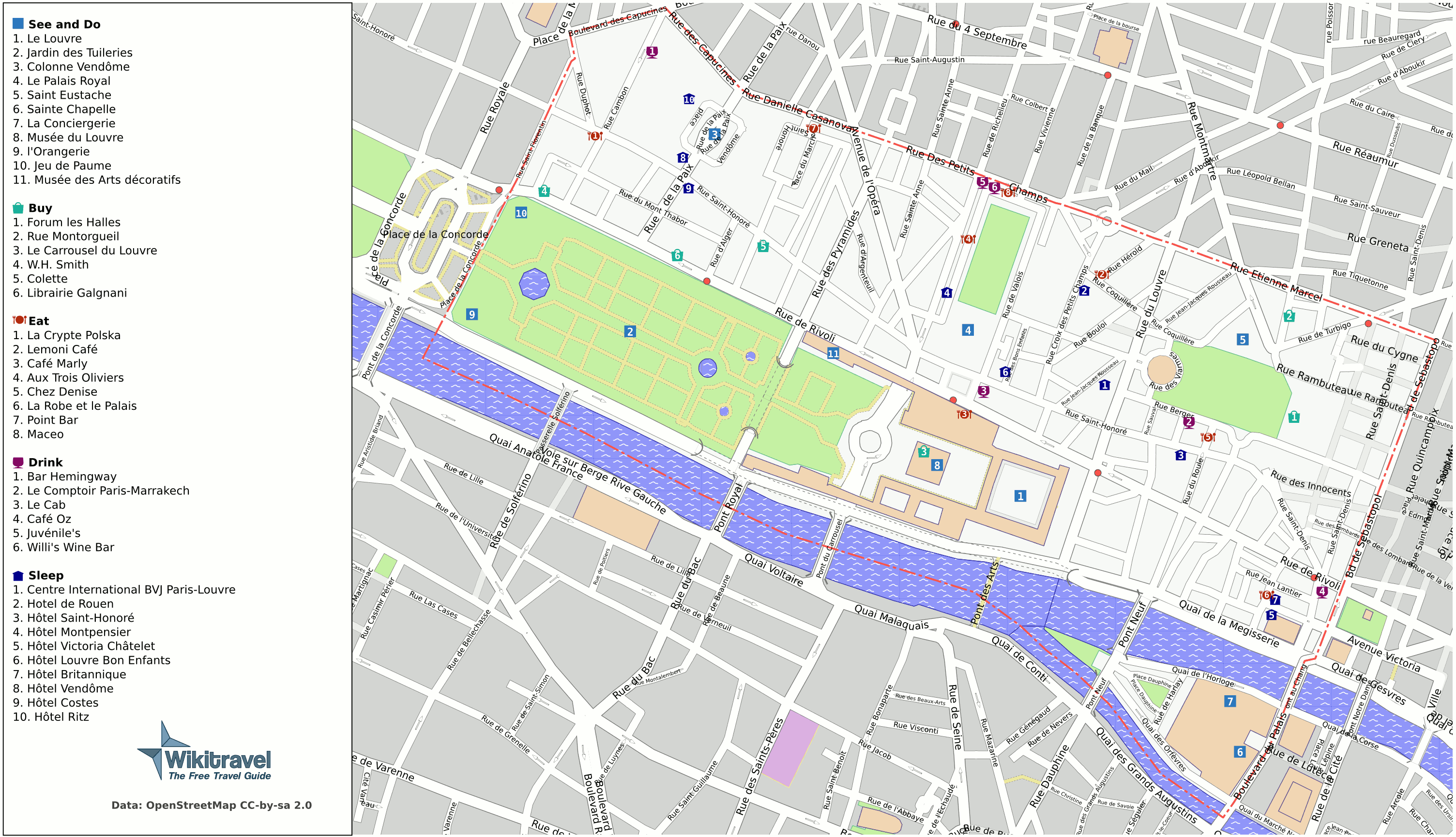
Annotated map of the 1st arrondissement of Paris generated for a guide to travel of Wikitravel from OpenStreetMap data

Wikitravel was started in July 2003 by Evan Prodromou and Michele Ann Jenkins, who while traveling felt that the update cycle on traditional guidebooks was too long and wanted something able to be updated more quickly. It was partly inspired by Wikipedia. To allow individuals, tourism agencies, and others to make free reprints of individual pages more easily than permitted by the GNU Free Documentation License (used by Wikipedia at that time) it used the Creative Commons Attribution ShareAlike license. Since Wikipedia and Wikitravel are licensed under the Attribution ShareAlike license, appropriate content can be shared between the two so long as licensing requirements are met.

Wikitravel does not have a neutral-point-of-view requirement, as it is written from the point of view of a traveler and, instead, encourages editors to "be fair". Wikitravel encourages original research in its content, and therefore does not generally require citation, but it does require contributions to comply with its Manual of Style, to provide an easily recognised and consistent layout and appearance, and to avoid touting.

On April 20, 2006, Wikitravel announced that it and World66—another open-content wiki travel guide founded in 1999—had been acquired by Internet Brands, a publicly traded corporation. The new owner hired Prodromou and Jenkins to continue managing Wikitravel as a consensus-based project. They explained that Internet Brands' long-term plan was for Wikitravel to continue to focus on collaborative, objective guides, while World66 would focus more on personal experiences and reviews. In response, many authors of the German language community chose to fork the German Wikitravel, which was released on December 10, 2006, as Wikivoyage. The German language Wikitravel remains active. On April 1, 2008, Internet Brands added Google advertising to Wikitravel, with an opt-out procedure for registered users.

On August 3, 2007, Prodromou, Jenkins, and long-time contributor Jani Patokallio started Wikitravel Press, a company that produces and sells print guidebooks based on material contributed to Wikitravel. The first Wikitravel Press guides, Chicago and Singapore, were launched on February 1, 2008. Content in these guidebooks was available under the same Creative Commons Attribution ShareAlike license under which Wikitravel material is licensed. The Wikitravel trademarks were licensed to Wikitravel Press, but there was otherwise no connection to Internet Brands. By September 2010, there were guides published for 7 cities with 3 more being developed. Wikitravel Press ceased to operate in 2011.

On January 1, 2010, the content of Wikitravel was migrated to the updated Creative Commons Attribution ShareAlike 3.0 license.

In mid-2012, a proposal was floated by members of the editing community to fork their work at Wikitravel (forking in this context means to move editing activities and current content to a new host, in accordance with the site license) and re-merge with the travel website Wikivoyage—which had been a fork of German and Italian language Wikitravel some years before—and to then seek hosting of the merged sites by the non-profit Wikimedia Foundation. Internet Brands opposed this move and sued one Wikitravel contributor and one Wikipedia contributor, alleging trademark infringement, unfair competition, and civil conspiracy. This move was opposed by individuals and by the Wikimedia Foundation as being an example of a SLAPP lawsuit—one undertaken without plausible legal grounds with a primary intent being to deter, overwhelm, or frustrate persons engaged in fully lawful actions.

=== Community fork in 2012 ===
In 2012, after a lengthy history of dissatisfaction with Wikitravel's host and owner Internet Brands, it was proposed that the community at Wikitravel fork (split off) their work and editing activities from Wikitravel and Wikitravel Shared and—with the existing sites at Wikivoyage—merge to create a new travel wiki to be hosted by the Wikimedia Foundation, the owner of Wikipedia and a large range of other non-profit reference sites based upon wiki communities. The dissatisfaction related to long-standing discontent at poor hosting, poor site updates, and excessive monetization and advertising, and eventually, interference by Internet Brands in the community's activities in breach of prior agreements and understandings.

After lengthy discussion by users of the three communities and comments by their respective hosts, and confirmation by the Wikimedia Foundation that it would host a travel project if users wished, the majority of administrators and bureaucrats at Wikitravel decided to fork their existing work to Wikivoyage.

The contents of Wikitravel and its related 'Commons' (images, video and other media files) in all languages and of Wikitravel Commons were downloaded as a 'database dump' in preparation for such a migration on August 2, 2012, and as the starting point for the existing wiki. Forking is a normal or anticipated activity in wiki communities and is permitted by the Creative Commons license in use on sites such as Wikitravel; the wiki software used for Wikitravel included that facility, although Internet Brands disabled the function shortly after this date to forestall the attempt at data migration or forking. The community discussion at Wikimedia ended 23 August 2012 with 540 votes in support and 152 votes in opposition of the creation of a Wikimedia Foundation travel guide project. The wiki text was moved to Wikimedia Foundation servers on November 10, 2012.

A significant part of the editing community including most of the administrators at the time, and the existing Wikitravel content for most languages resumed under the 'Wikivoyage' name as www.wikivoyage.org, as an ad-free and not-for-profit reference site in early 2013.

On August 24, 2012, Internet Brands filed a lawsuit in Los Angeles County Superior Court against Wikitravel administrator Ryan Holliday and Wikipedia administrator James Heilman involving claims of trademark infringement and unfair business practices. In September 2012, the Wikimedia Foundation filed a complaint in San Francisco County Superior Court on behalf of Holliday and Heilman asking the court to declare that "forking has and remains a legal activity." In February 2013 the parties settled their litigation. The terms of the settlement were not reported.

=== Since the fork ===
In 2016, parent company Internet Brands purchased Fodor's from Penguin Random House.

== Reception ==
On May 1, 2007, Wikitravel received the Webby Award for the best "sites that promote travel and lifestyle, including flights/hotels, travel guides, reviews, tips, experiences, and leisure activities."

In July 2007, Matthew Honan wrote in Macworld that it was becoming the world's most comprehensive guide book.

On June 16, 2008, Wikitravel was named one of the "50 Best Websites of 2008" by Time magazine.

In 2010, Dan Fletcher wrote in Time magazine that he combined Wikitravel with a traditional guide book, citing the benefits of a wisdom-of-the-crowd approach where Wikitravel should have something for everybody if different people interested in different things contribute to the project. Fletcher also appreciates the entertaining, tongue-in-cheek humorous editorial writings of some volunteers.

In a 2012 New York Times article, professor Lila A. Bailey was quoted as predicting that the volunteers would leave Wikitravel for Wikivoyage because Wikivoyage offered a "warm and fuzzy brand that is free with no ads."

In February 2013, Iljitsch van Beijnum said Wikitravel was 'invaluable' as a travel resource, noting how it could be accessed on the iTravelFree app for offline use.

== See also ==
- List of content forks of Wikipedia
