= Vinismo =

Defunct online wine database

- Website type: Wiki
- Available in: English, French, Italian
- Commercial: No
- Registration: Not required
- Launched: July 24, 2007; 19 years ago
- Content license: Creative Commons Attribution-ShareAlike 2.5 Canada

Vinismo.com was a website with the goal of having a free, complete, up-to-date, and reliable guide of all wine regions and producers in the world. It was founded in April, 2007 by Evan Prodromou and launched on July 24, 2007. It used the MediaWiki software platform for management of its content. As of February 2011, Vinismo was no longer working, even though in May 2010 it had 35,000 articles contributed by over 600 authors.

The site was organized by Regions, Wineries and Grapes. Its regions were divided into Wines of Europe (including France, Italy, Germany and Spain) and Wines of the New World (such as California, Australia and Chile). The Grapes were categorized by Reds (such as Cabernet Sauvignon, Merlot, Pinot Noir, and Zinfandel) and Whites (e.g. Chardonnay, Riesling and Sauvignon Blanc).

Since May 30, 2009, the project had changed to focus more on "offering a knowledge base on wine regions, producers and grapes than a listing of individual wines".

Vinismo was also the first site to use the form extension to the MediaWiki software platform. The extension lets users create new articles with a form interface.

In addition to English, French and Italian versions of Vinismo were launched.

== See also ==
- Wine
