= OpenMicroBlogging =

Microblogging protocol

OpenMicroBlogging is a deprecated communication protocol that allows different microblogging services to interoperate with each other. It lets the user of one service subscribe to statuses from a user of another service. This enables the creation of a federation of new communities, as an individual or organization of any size can host a service that supports the protocol. OpenMicroBlogging utilizes the OAuth and Yadis protocols and does not depend on any central authority.

OpenMicroBlogging has been superseded by an enhanced version of it, OStatus.

== History ==
The original implementation of the OpenMicroBlogging protocol is the Laconica software, which changed its name to StatusNet in August 2009. Identi.ca is the first service to support OpenMicroBlogging, and other sizeable services including Leo Laporte's Twit Army were amongst those powered by the open source software.

Since March 2009, one can search users' accounts in TWiT Army from within Identi.ca. You could also subscribe to accounts at TWiT Army from your Identi.ca account.

A third-party implementation of the OpenMicroBlogging protocol is the OpenMicroBlogger software.

== See also ==
- ActivityPub
- Comparison of microblogging services
- Decentralized social network
- OStatus
