= Super Lawyers =

Legal information business

- Industry: Legal Information
- Founded: 1991
- Founder: Steve Kaplan; Bill White
- Headquarters: El Segundo, California
- Key people: Robert Brisco (president) & (CEO)
- Products: Super Lawyers magazine; lawyer directory
- Owner: Internet Brands
- Website: superlawyers.com

Super Lawyers is a business owned by Internet Brands.

Founded in 1991 by Steve Kaplan and Bill White, the company was acquired by Thomson Reuters in 2010. It was then acquired by Internet Brands in December 2024 as part of that company’s purchase of Thomson Reuters’ FindLaw business.

== History ==
=== 1990-2010: Founding and expansion ===
The first Super Lawyers (a play on the term “supermodels”) list was published in the 1991 issue of Minnesota Law & Politics. According to White, the August issue became the best-selling issue every year because of the list.”

After L&P was acquired by MSP Communications in 1996, the L&P magazine expanded to a Washington state edition, which also included a Super Lawyers list for the state. The website www.superlawyers.com was first registered in 1998.

=== 2010-2024: Thomson Reuters ownership ===
On Feb. 2, 2010, Thomson Reuters announced that it had acquired Super Lawyers from Key Professional Media. The business was integrated into the corporation’s Business of Law unit, bringing it under the same roof as FindLaw, which TR acquired in 2001.

The publication continued to expand the number of lists available, including the Top 10 attorneys and the Top 10 women in a market. Super Lawyers and Rising Stars lists for London were launched in 2013, and a UK-based website went live in 2014 (the project was discontinued in 2016).

=== 2024-Present: Internet Brands ownership ===
On October 3, 2024, Thomson Reuters announced the sale of its FindLaw business, including Super Lawyers, to Internet Brands, with the transaction closing on December 2.

== Criticism ==
In New Jersey, the state Supreme Court’s Committee on Attorney Advertising issued an opinion in 2006 stating that lawyers in the state should not purchase ads promoting their selection to the Super Lawyers or Rising Stars lists.

While the committee did not find fault with a free selection to the list, it argued that purchasing an ad touting that selection was making unfair promises about results by virtue of earning the selection. “When a potential client reads such advertising and considers hiring a ‘super’ attorney, or the ‘best’ attorney, the superlative designation induces the client to feel that the results that can be achieved by this attorney are likely to surpass those that can be achieved by a mere ‘ordinary’ attorney.”

The New Jersey Supreme Court struck down that opinion in 2008.
