= Personal web server =

A personal web server (PWS) is system of hardware and software that is designed to create and manage a web server on a desktop computer for individuals or employees. It can be used to learn how to set up and administer a website, to serve as a site for testing dynamic web pages, or to serve web pages in a closed environment not accessible on the internet. One of the main functions of PWS is to provide an environment where web programmers can test their programs and web pages. Therefore, a PWS supports the more common server-side programming approaches that can be used with production web servers.

A personal web server, or personal server in short, allows users to store, selectively share, or publish information on the web or on a home network. Unlike other types of web servers, a personal web server is owned or controlled by an individual or organization, and operated for the individual's needs. It can be implemented in different ways:

- as a computer appliance
- as a general-purpose server, such as a Linux server, which may be located at the owner's home or in a data center
- in a shared hosting model, where several users share one physical server by means of virtualization, or virtual hosting.
- as one feature of a computer that is otherwise also used for other purposes.

A personal web server is conceptually the opposite of a web server, or website, operated by third parties, in a software as a service (SaaS) or cloud model.

== Advantages ==
- Privacy: as the personal server is owned by the individual that derives the main benefit from it, they are in control of who else may access information on the server
- Autonomy: the owner of the personal server decides which applications to run on the server, whom to allow access to, when to upgrade, etc.
- Hackability: the owner of the personal server can configure and change any aspect of the personal server

== Disadvantages ==
- Administration overhead: the owner of the server is responsible for system administration
- Higher power consumption: the power consumed per user is higher, on average, than in a model where many users use the same server, such as in the SaaS/cloud model.
- Poor scalability: the server may function poorly or crash if its resources are heavily accessed

== See also ==
- Comparison of web server software
- Microsoft Personal Web Server
