= Gnip =

American social media API aggregation company

Gnip, Inc.
- Available in: English
- Founded: 2008
- Headquarters: Boulder, Colorado, United States
- Area served: Worldwide
- Founders: Jud Valeski and Eric Marcoullier
- Industry: Social Media API Aggregation
- Website: www.gnip.com

Gnip, Inc. was a social media API aggregation company that was purchased by Twitter in 2014. Headquartered in Boulder, Colorado, it provided data from dozens of social media websites via a single API. Gnip was among the first social media API aggregation services.

Gnip is known as an early influencer in building the real-time web. The company has also been instrumental in defining relevant web standards: Gnip's co-founder Eric Marcoullier actively advocated for adoption of open web standards, and helped define the new Activity Streams format for web data.

Subsequent to a 2010 data licensing agreement with Twitter Inc, Twitter purchased Gnip in April 2014.

== History ==
Gnip was founded by Jud Valeski and Eric Marcoullier with an initial investment of $1 million. The company was based on the premise that collecting data from many social APIs simultaneously is tedious and time-consuming. It dubbed itself the "Grand Central Station for the Social Web" shortly after launch. Although the company launched with just a few basic features such as notifications, the product was designed to act as an intermediary to simplify the collection of social media data. The company used the tagline "making data portability suck less."

By the end of 2008, Gnip had raised $3.5 million in Series B funding from investors such as the Foundry Group and First Round Capital. The service was used for projects like collecting huge volumes of data for analyzing Twitter clients.

In 2009, Gnip launched a Push API. In September, Gnip underwent a significant product overhaul accompanied by an internal restructuring of resources.

In 2010, Gnip launched their new and revised social media data collection product and released a manual describing use cases and significance of Twitter Inc's streaming API. Gnip's sources included Twitter, Facebook, YouTube, Flickr, Google Buzz, Vimeo, and others.

In April 2014, Gnip was acquired by Twitter for $134.1 million in mostly cash and some stock.
