= Finn Brunton =

American researcher and writer

Finn Brunton is an American research and writer, specialising in artificial intelligence, cybernetics, and cryptography, best known for his publications Digital Cash: The Unknown History of the Anarchists, Utopians, and Technologists Who Created Cryptocurrency (2019), Communication (2019), Obfuscation: A User’s Guide for Privacy and Protest (2015), and Spam: A Shadow History of the Internet (2013). He has also published a guest essay in the New York Times in 2025. He was an associate professor in the Department of Media, Culture, and Communication at New York University. Currently, he is Professor of Science and Technology Studies and Cinema and Digital Media at University of California, Davis, where he also coordinates the research node on cultural imaginaries at UC Davis Center for Artificial Intelligence and Experimental Futures (CAIEF).
