= Breather (company) =

Flexible office and meeting space

- Industry: Prop Tech
- Founded: 1 November 2012
- Founder: Caterina Rizzi, Julien Smith
- Headquarters: Montreal, Canada
- Area served: North America & the UK
- Key people: Bryan Murphy (CEO); Aja Baxter (General Counsel); Dan Suozzi (CREO); Glenn Felson (CSO); Mark Frackt (CFO); Philippe Bouffaut (CTO); Samantha Goldman (VP of Marketing)
- Products: Flexible office and On Demand Meeting Space
- Website: breather.com

Breather is a flexible workspace provider based in Montreal, Canada.

== History ==
Breather was founded by Caterina Rizzi and Julien Smith, the company's CEO. The idea came from Smith when he traveled and found himself working in various coffee shops. Smith is author of three books and often traveled for public speaking events. He founded the company as a way to let people find a quiet space. Breather had a soft launch in Montreal before expanding to New York City. As of 2019, the company had more than 500 private workplaces available in 10 major cities.

As of June 2018 the company has raised a cumulative $122.5 million in funding.

In January 2019, the company announced that Julien Smith would step down as CEO. He was replaced by Bryan Murphy, a former eBay executive.

In December 2020, it was reported that the company's US and UK subsidiaries filed for insolvency in order to pull out from leases in over 355 offices. This follows the company's larger plan to reach profitability by 2021, after overspending US$120 million of the $122 million it had raised in venture funding.

In May 2021, Industrious, a USA provider of flexible workspaces, acquired key assets of Breather's listings platform. Breather now operates as a marketplace where customers can search and book conference rooms that are listed by third party landlords.
