= Activity Streams (format) =

File format

- Filename extension: .json
- Internet media type: application/activity+json
- Type of format: Web syndication
- Extended from: JSON-LD
- Standards: W3C Activity Streams
- Website: activitystrea.ms

Activity Streams is an open format specification for activity stream protocols, which are used to syndicate activities taken in social web applications and services, similar to those in Facebook's, Instagram's, and Twitter's.

Components of Activity Streams

The standard provides a general way to represent activities. For instance, the sentence "Jack added Hawaii to his list of places to visit" would be represented in ActivityStreams as actor:jack, verb:add, object:Hawaii, target:placestovisit.

Implementors of the Activity Streams draft include Gnip, Stream, Stream Framework, and Pump.io.

The largest open source library (based on watchers) is Stream Framework, the authors of Stream Framework also run getstream.io. In addition there is a trend of SOA (service-oriented architecture) where third parties power this type of functionality.

GeoSPARQL provides OWL and RDFS alignments to the Activity Streams vocabulary.

== Example ==
{
  "@context": "https://www.w3.org/ns/activitystreams",
  "summary": "A note",
  "type": "Note",
  "content": "My dog has fleas."
}

== See also ==
- ActivityPub
