= List of most-followed Bluesky accounts =

This list contains the top 50 accounts (Note: This list does not include Bluesky's account as new accounts automatically follow it.) with the most followers on the social media platform Bluesky. Notable figures such as Alexandria Ocasio-Cortez, Mark Cuban, George Takei, Mark Hamill, Stephen King and Rachel Maddow are at the top of the list, each with over 1 million followers. As of October 2026, only ten accounts have reached the 1 million mark, with Alexandria Ocasio-Cortez being the only one to exceed 2 million followers.

== Most followed accounts ==
The following table lists the top 50 most-followed accounts on Bluesky, with the abbreviated follower count as well as a description of each account.

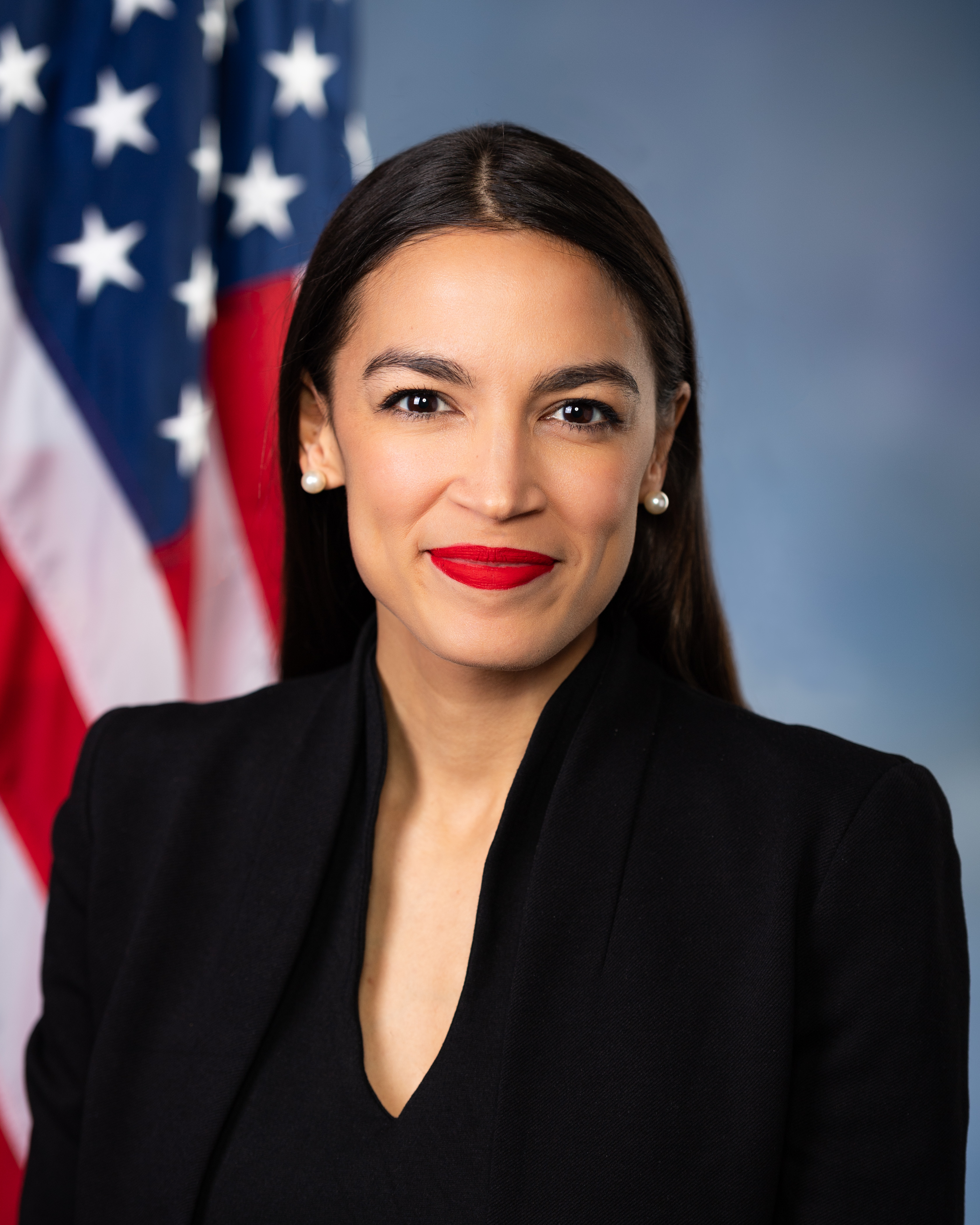
Current U.S. representative Alexandria Ocasio-Cortez is the most-followed person on Bluesky.

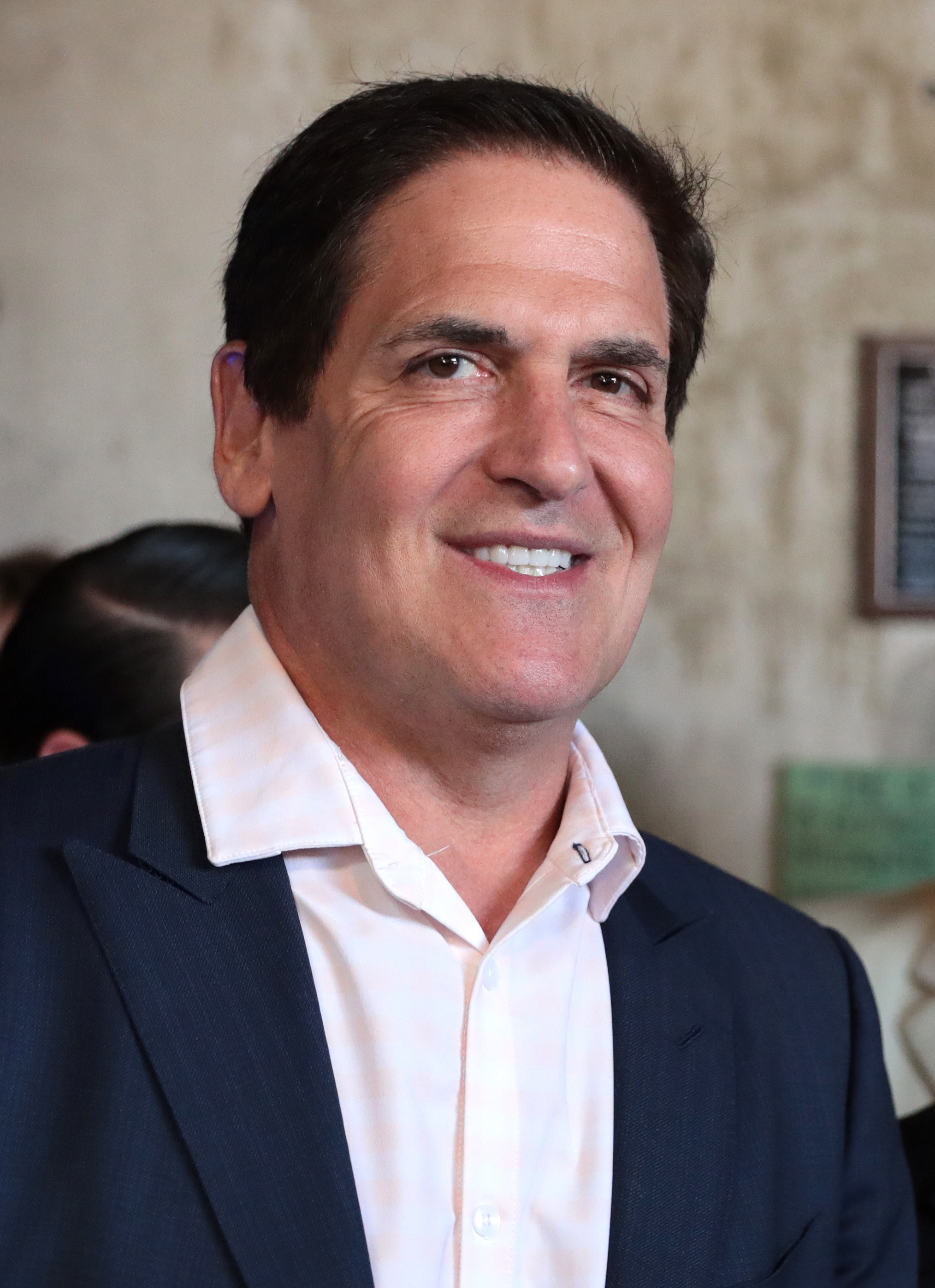
Businessman Mark Cuban is the most-followed man on Bluesky.

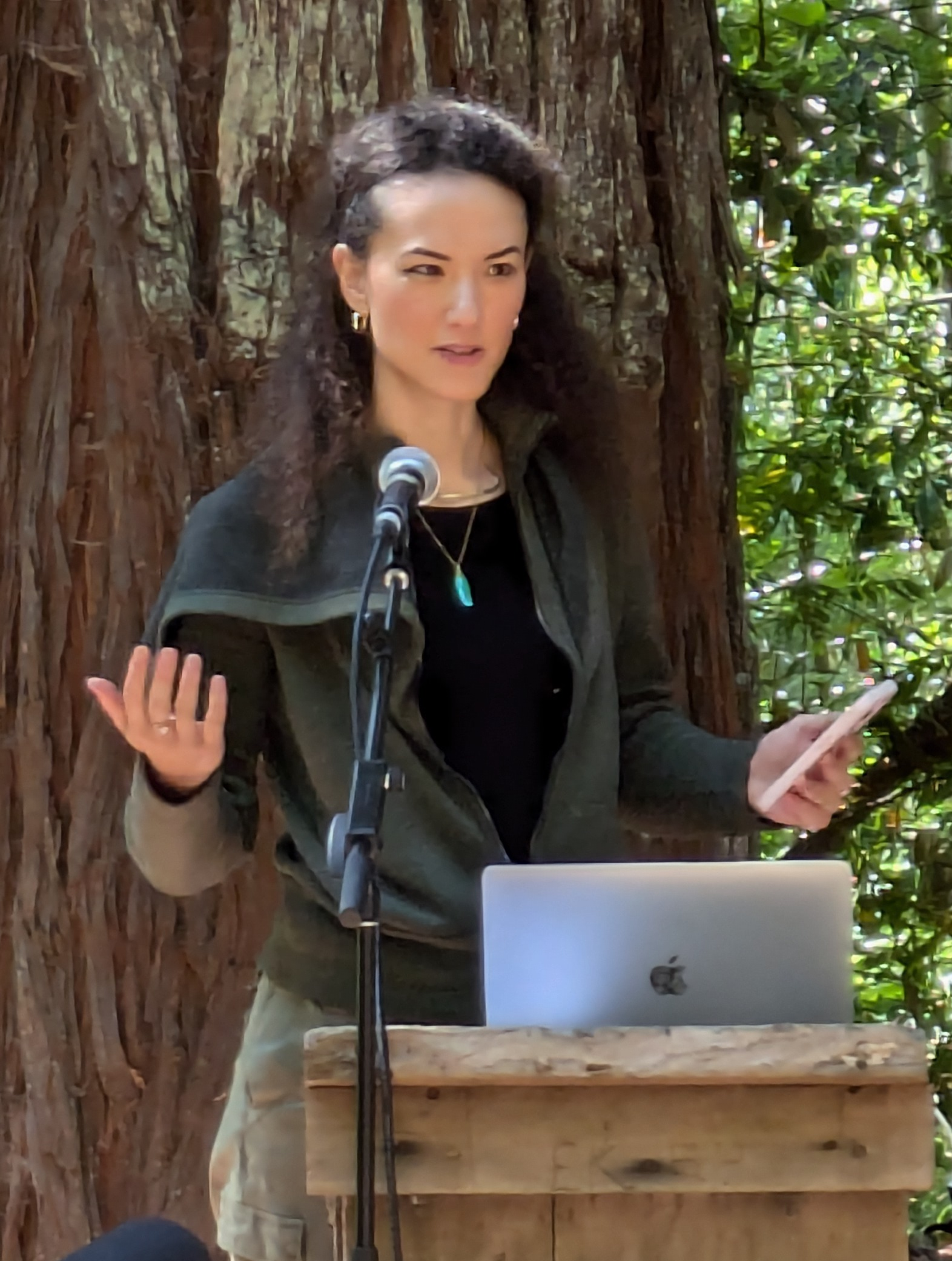
Jay Graber, CINO and former CEO of Bluesky, has the 38th most-followed account on Bluesky.

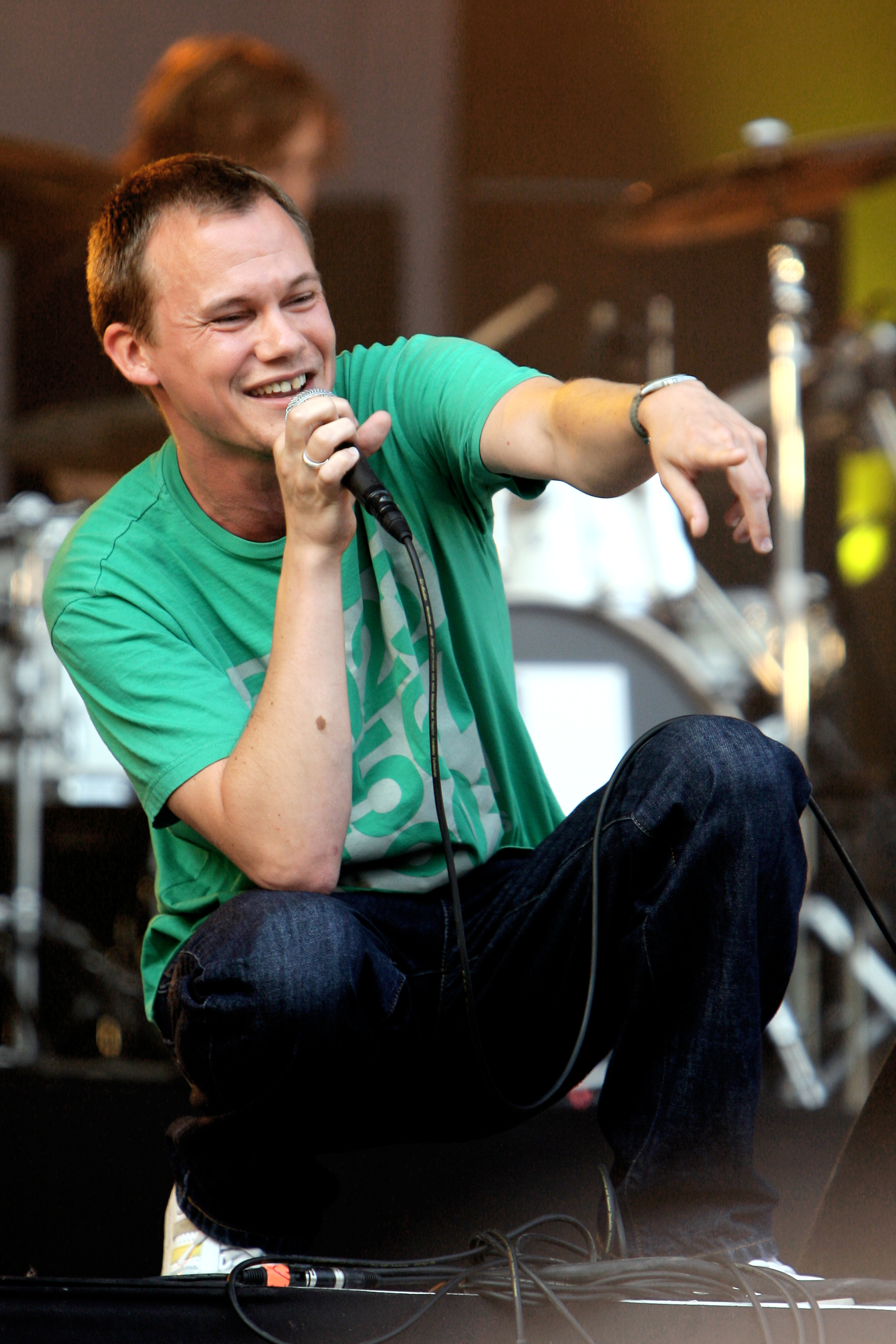
Just Jack is the most-followed musician on Bluesky.

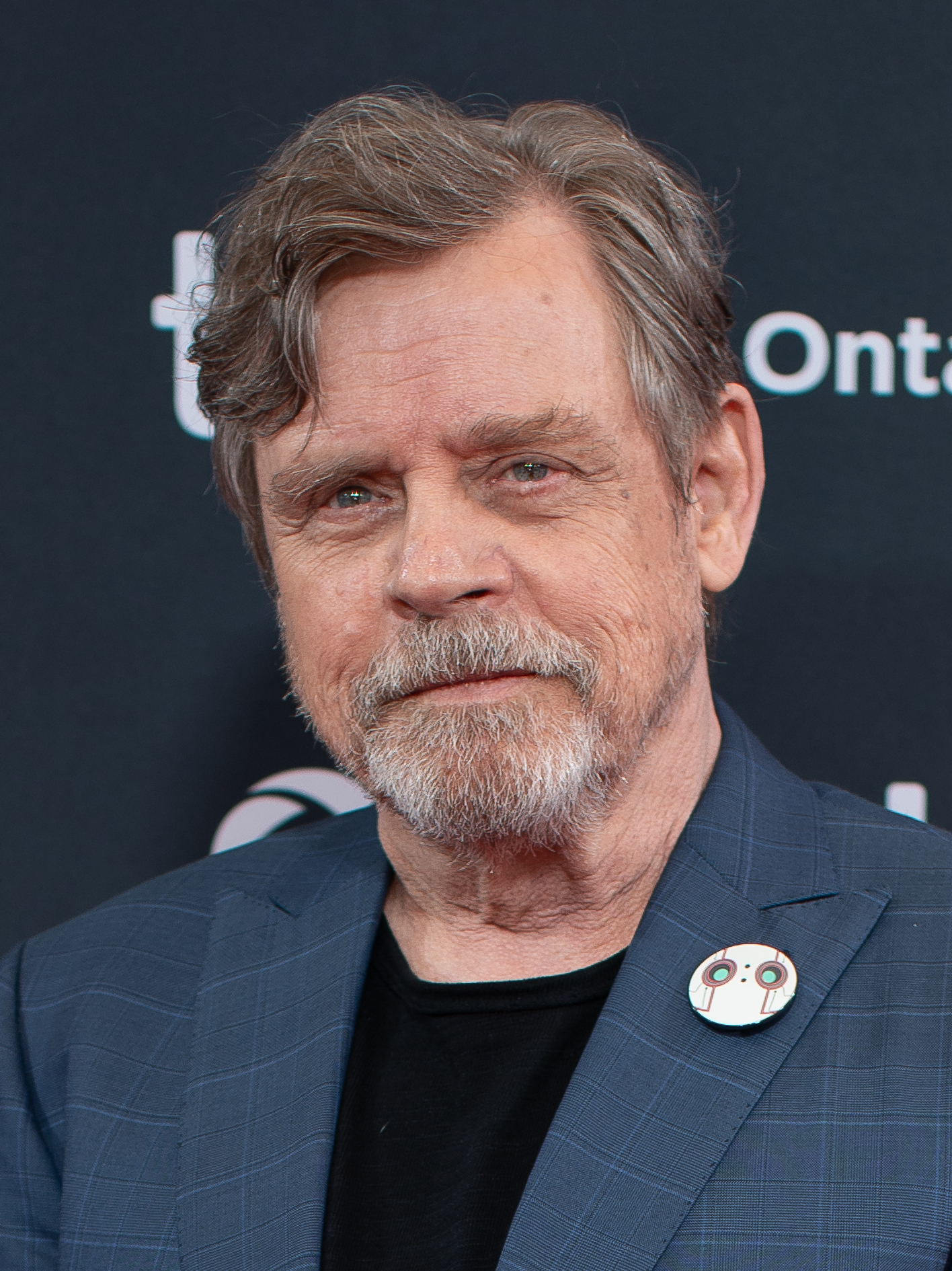
Mark Hamill is the most-followed film and television personality on Bluesky.

Rank	Username	Owner	Followers	Description	Brand account
1	@aoc.bsky.social	Alexandria Ocasio-Cortez	2.20M	Politician	
2	@mcuban.bsky.social	Mark Cuban	1.48M	Businessman	
3	@markhamillofficial.bsky.social	Mark Hamill	1.38M	Actor	
4	@theonion.com	The Onion	1.35M	Satire news organization	Yes
5	@nytimes.com	The New York Times	1.35M	Newspaper	Yes
6	@georgetakei.bsky.social	George Takei	1.32M	Actor, author and activist	
7	@maddow.bsky.social	Rachel Maddow	1.14M	Television host and commentator	
8	@stephenking.bsky.social	Stephen King	1.12M	Author	
9	@meidastouch.com	MeidasTouch	1.07M	Progressive online media network	Yes
10	@npr.org	NPR	1.01M	Nonprofit public broadcasting organization	Yes
11	@atrupar.com	Aaron Rupar	975K	Independent journalist	
12	@altnps.bsky.social	Alt National Park Service	896K	Former National Park Service employees and supporters	Yes
13	@washingtonpost.com	The Washington Post	873K	Newspaper	Yes
14	@hankgreen.bsky.social	Hank Green	847K	Vlogger and entrepreneur	
15	@briantylercohen.bsky.social	Brian Tyler Cohen	839K	Journalist and podcaster	
16	@gtconway.bsky.social	George Conway	837K	Attorney and activist	
17	@rbreich.bsky.social	Robert Reich	819K	Academic, lawyer and political commentator	
18	@chrislhayes.bsky.social	Chris Hayes	814K	Political journalist and author	
19	@theguardian.com	The Guardian	794K	Newspaper	Yes
20	@ronfilipkowski.bsky.social	Ron Filipkowski	789K	Criminal defense attorney	
21	@hcrichardson.bsky.social	Heather Cox Richardson	781K	Historian	
22	@mollyjongfast.bsky.social	Molly Jong-Fast	775K	Author and pundit	
23	@petebuttigieg.bsky.social	Pete Buttigieg	760K	Politician	
24	@jamellebouie.net	Jamelle Bouie	751K	Columnist and political correspondent	
25	@pattonoswalt.bsky.social	Patton Oswalt	744K	Comedian and actor	
26	@lincolnproject.us	The Lincoln Project	740K	Political action committee	Yes
27	@muellershewrote.com	Mueller, She Wrote	740K	Comedy and political podcast	Yes
28	@marcelias.bsky.social	Marc Elias	739K	Lawyer	
29	@adamkinzinger.substack.com	Adam Kinzinger	729K	Politician	
30	@cnn.com	CNN	658K	News channel	Yes
31	@dieworkwear.bsky.social	Derek Guy	647K	Menswear writer	
32	@propublica.org	ProPublica	647K	Nonprofit investigative journalism organization	Yes
33	@barackobama.bsky.social	Barack Obama	643K	Politician, lawyer and author	
34	@acyn.bsky.social	Acyn	639K	Senior digital editor for MeidasTouch	
35	@aaronparnas.bsky.social	Aaron Parnas	626K	Lawyer	
36	@mehdirhasan.bsky.social	Mehdi Hasan	626K	Broadcaster and author	
37	@thegodshow.com	The God Show	595K	Political podcast	
38	@jay.bsky.team	Jay Graber	594K	Software engineer, CINO and former CEO of Bluesky	
39	@thedailyshow.com	The Daily Show	588K	Late-night satirical news television program	Yes
40	@dril.bsky.social	Dril	575K	Pseudonymous user	
41	@sanders.senate.gov	Bernie Sanders	573K	Politician and activist	
42	@bencollins.bsky.social	Ben Collins	565K	Businessman and former journalist	
43	@crockett.house.gov	Jasmine Crockett	564K	Politician	
44	@weratedogs.com	WeRateDogs	562K	Dog-related account	Yes
45	@joycewhitevance.bsky.social	Joyce White Vance	559K	Lawyer	
46	@jojofromjerz.bsky.social	Jo Carducci	536K	Podcaster and writer	
47	@joncooper-us.bsky.social	Jon Cooper	528K	Democratic strategist	
48	@politico.com	Politico	526K	Digital newspaper	Yes
49	@therickwilson.bsky.social	Rick Wilson	522K	Political strategist, media consultant, and author	
50	@katiephang.bsky.social	Katie Phang	505K	Journalist for MeidasTouch	
As of 18 October 2026
