= Lantian (disambiguation) =

Lantian may refer to:

- Lantian County (蓝田县), of Xi'an, Shaanxi, China
- Lam Tin, Hong Kong (spelled 'Lantian' in Mandarin pinyin)
- Lantian Graber, American software engineer and CEO of Bluesky
- Lantian man, a sub-species of Homo Erectus
- Lantian Township in Chengkou County, Chongqing, China
