= Aaron Rupar =

American journalist (born 1983)

- Born: Aaron T. Rupar; October 21, 1983 (age 42)
- Education: Hamline University (BA); University of Minnesota (MA)
- Occupation: Journalist
- Years active: 2010–present
- Children: 2

X information
- Handle: @atrupar
- Display name: Aaron Rupar
- Years active: 2011–present
- Followers: 1.1 million
- Last updated: October 12, 2026
- Website: www.publicnotice.co

Aaron T. Rupar (born October 21, 1983) is an American independent journalist known for posting newsworthy video clips of political figures on social media. He has written the newsletter Public Notice since 2021. He was previously an associate editor for the websites ThinkProgress and Vox.

== Early life ==
Rupar grew up in Forest Lake, Minnesota, north of Minneapolis. He graduated from Hamline University in Saint Paul, Minnesota, in 2006, majoring in political science and philosophy. He then began a philosophy PhD program at the University of Minnesota, completing his master's degree in 2010.

== Career ==
Rupar began his career covering local politics in the Twin Cities. He wrote for the Faribault Daily News and Southwest Journal before making his name as a news blogger at the Minneapolis alternative weekly City Pages. He left City Pages to work for the TV station KMSP (Fox 9) and then the Minnesota Democratic–Farmer–Labor Party. In 2016, he moved to Washington, D.C., to become an associate editor for ThinkProgress, a progressive news site published by the Center for American Progress. He joined the news site Vox as an associate editor in 2018.

Ruper began regularly posting newsworthy video clips of political figures on X (then Twitter) in 2017. The first clip he posted showed John Kelly, the White House chief of staff, defending Confederate general Robert E. Lee on Fox News. His posts frequently going viral, he began monitoring a dozen TV channels at the same time to find clip-worthy content. He focused largely on conservative shows seeking moments his liberal audience would not have otherwise seen. He became especially known for posting clips of President Donald Trump, watching the president's TV appearances for sometimes 80 hours per week. Some observers criticized Rupar for amplifying Trump's messages or, alternatively, feeding a narrative of media bias against the president. He had more than 600,000 followers on X by 2020; he moved back to Minneapolis the same year.

Rupar launched his own newsletter, Public Notice, after leaving Vox in 2021. He started out writing each issue before recruiting other journalists to contribute most weeks. In 2022, his X account was briefly suspended along with several other journalists by new X owner Elon Musk, ostensibly for linking to an X account tracking Musk's private jet. Rupar later said the suspension contributed to his newsletter subscriber count more than doubling. By 2026, he had more than 250,000 subscribers on Substack, more than 900,000 followers on Bluesky, and more than a million followers on X.

== Personal life ==
Rupar and his wife have two children.

== See also ==
- List of most-followed Bluesky accounts
