= Social media use by Barack Obama =

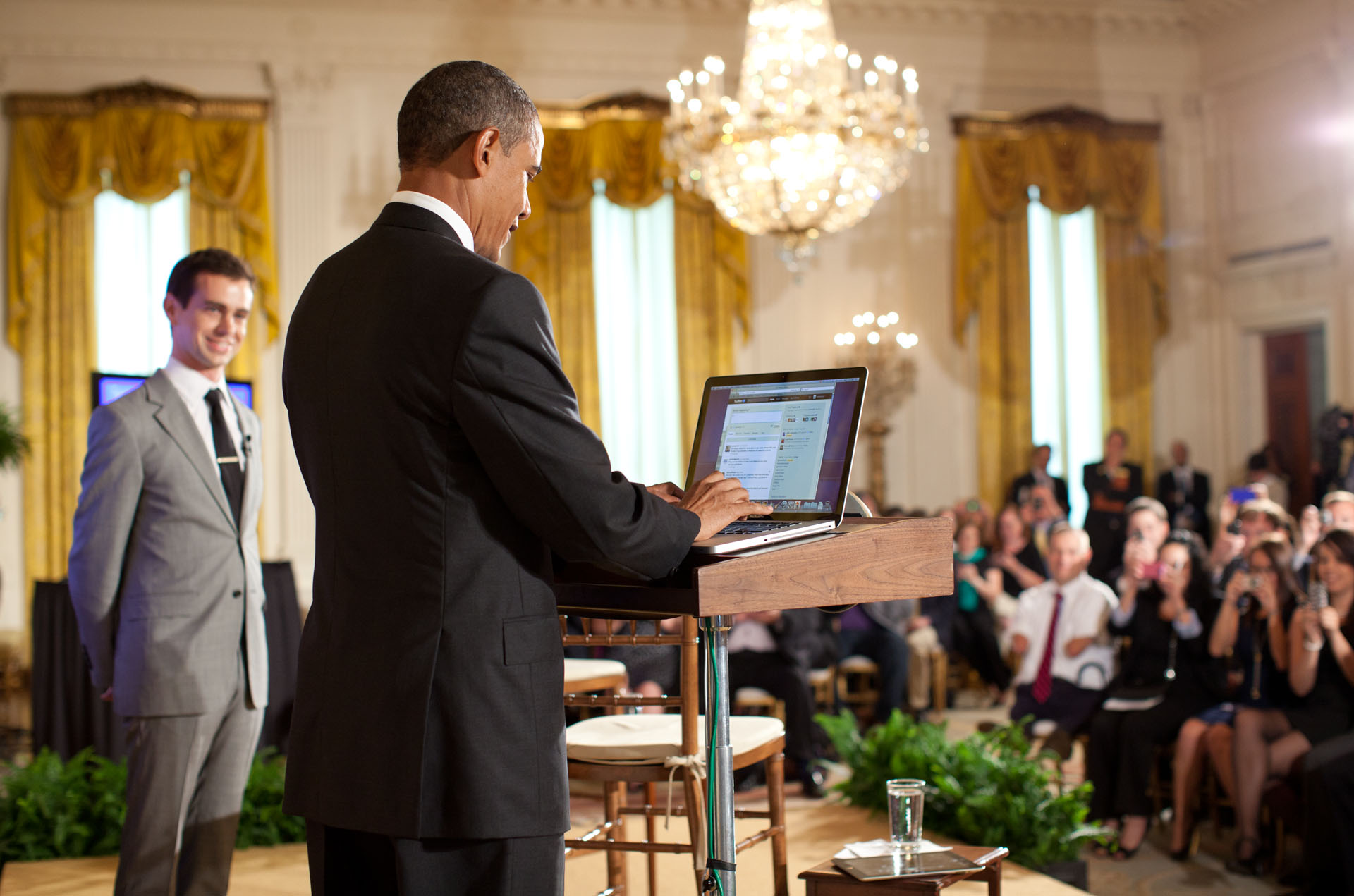
Barack Obama in the first presidential Twitter town hall meeting with service creator and moderator Jack Dorsey looking on

Barack Obama won the 2008 United States presidential election on November 4, 2008. During his campaign, he became the first presidential candidate of a major party to utilize social networking sites (such as podcasting, Twitter, Myspace, Facebook, and YouTube) to expand and engage his audience of supporters and donors.

Obama's adoption of social media for political campaigning has been compared to Franklin D. Roosevelt and John F. Kennedy's adoption of the radio and television media for communication with the American public.

In his 2008 presidential campaign, Obama had more friends on Facebook and Myspace and more followers on Twitter than his opponent John McCain.

== Twitter ==
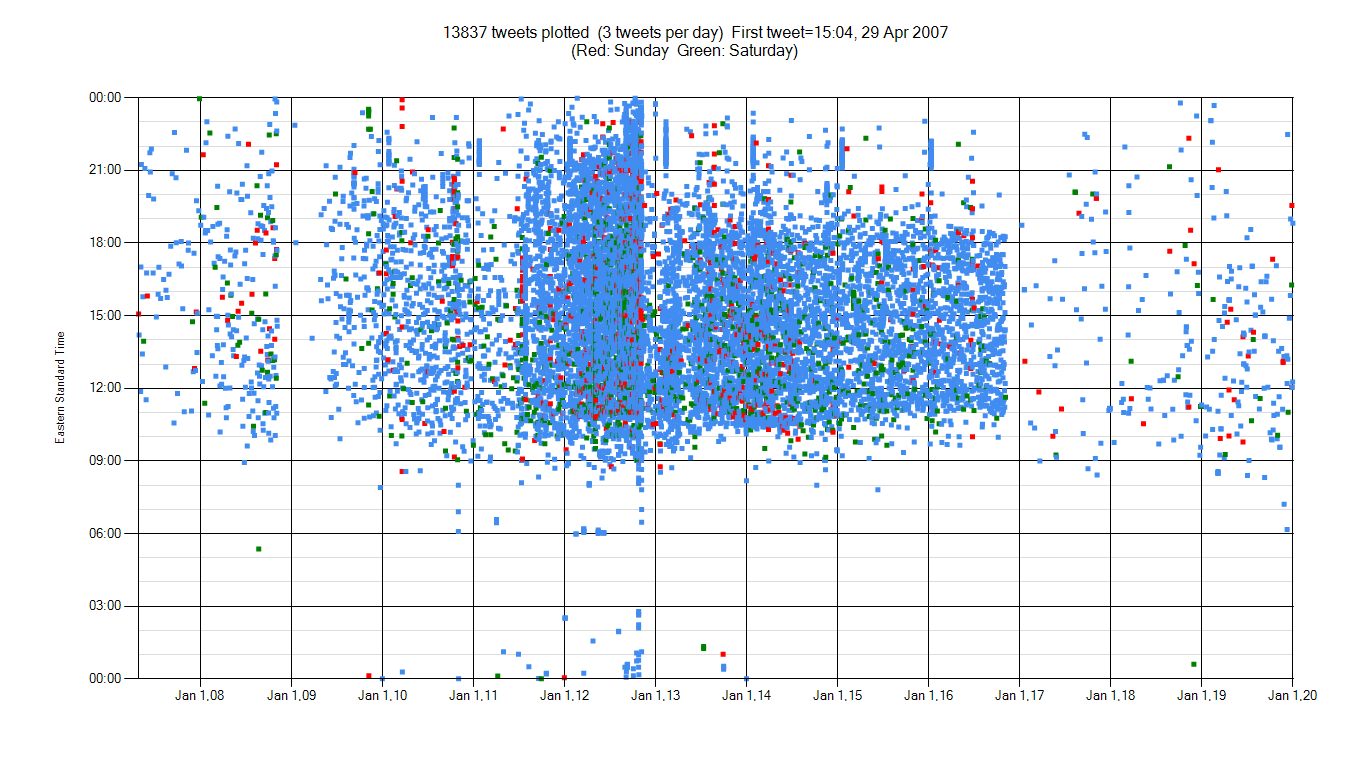
Twitter activity of Barack Obama from his first tweet in April 2007. Retweets are not included.

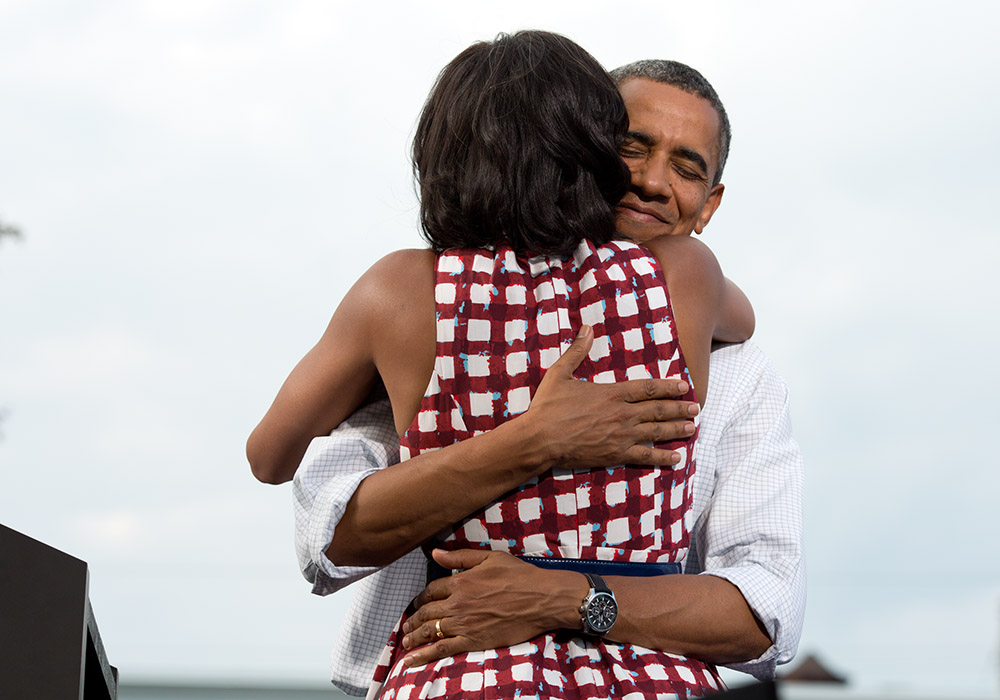
Barack Obama embraces Michelle Obama after she had introduced him at a 2012 election campaign event in Davenport, Iowa. The campaign tweeted a similar photograph from the campaign photographer on election night, and many people thought it was taken on election day.

Barack Obama's Twitter account (@BarackObama) is the official account on social networking site Twitter for former President of the United States Barack Obama. Obama also used the White House's Twitter account (@WhiteHouse) and the @POTUS account, which was created in May 2015. As of July 12, 2024, @BarackObama is the most-followed politician and second most-followed person on Twitter with over 131 million followers.

Obama has used Twitter to promote legislation and support for his policies, as well as respond to the public regarding current political issues like the economy and employment. As a major political figure with a presence on the platform, Obama became the subject of various debates on Twitter. During Obama's 2012 presidential campaign, the rapidly-increasing audience on Twitter gave the platform a larger role in communication efforts than in the 2008 campaign.

=== Statistics on Twitter usage ===
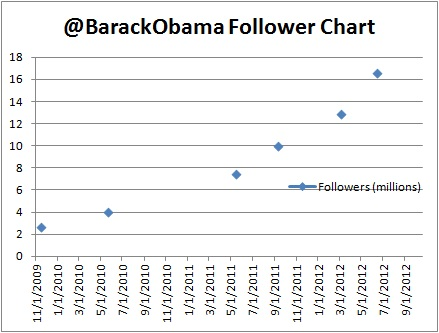
Graph of Obama's follower growth

The @BarackObama account is among the top ten worldwide in both followers and followed accounts. At one point, the account held the record for having the most people following it. On August 13, 2019, at 14:39 PDT, Obama's account overtook Katy Perry to become the most-followed person on Twitter with over 107 million followers.

During his 2008 campaign, the account was intermittently the world's most followed. In May 2010, Obama's Twitter account was the fourth most followed account, with about 4 million followers. By May 16, 2011, @BarackObama was followed by 7.4 million people, including twenty-eight world leaders. His account became the third to reach 10 million followers on Twitter in September of 2011.

=== Account usage history ===
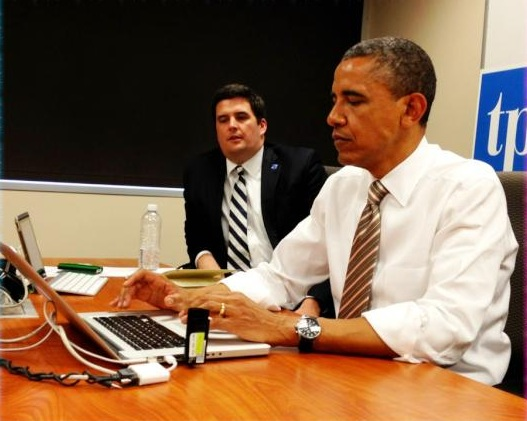
Obama "using Twitter" on May 24, 2012, in response to hashtagged questions

@BarackObama was launched on March 5, 2007, at 16:08:25. It is his official account, though he also tweeted through @WhiteHouse, the official account of the current presidential administration, while @BarackObama was mainly used by his campaign staff. @WhiteHouse predates the Presidency of Barack Obama, since it was created on April 21, 2007. Following the 2008 election, the Democratic National Committee was believed to have taken over Obama's official Twitter account; in a November 2009 speech, Obama stated "I have never used Twitter," although his account had over 2.6 million followers at the time. In 2011, the @BarackObama account was stated to be "run by #Obama2012 campaign staff. Tweets from the President are signed -bo." The first Tweet using Obama's initials was posted for Father's Day in 2011 with the message, "Being a father is sometimes my hardest but always my most rewarding job..."

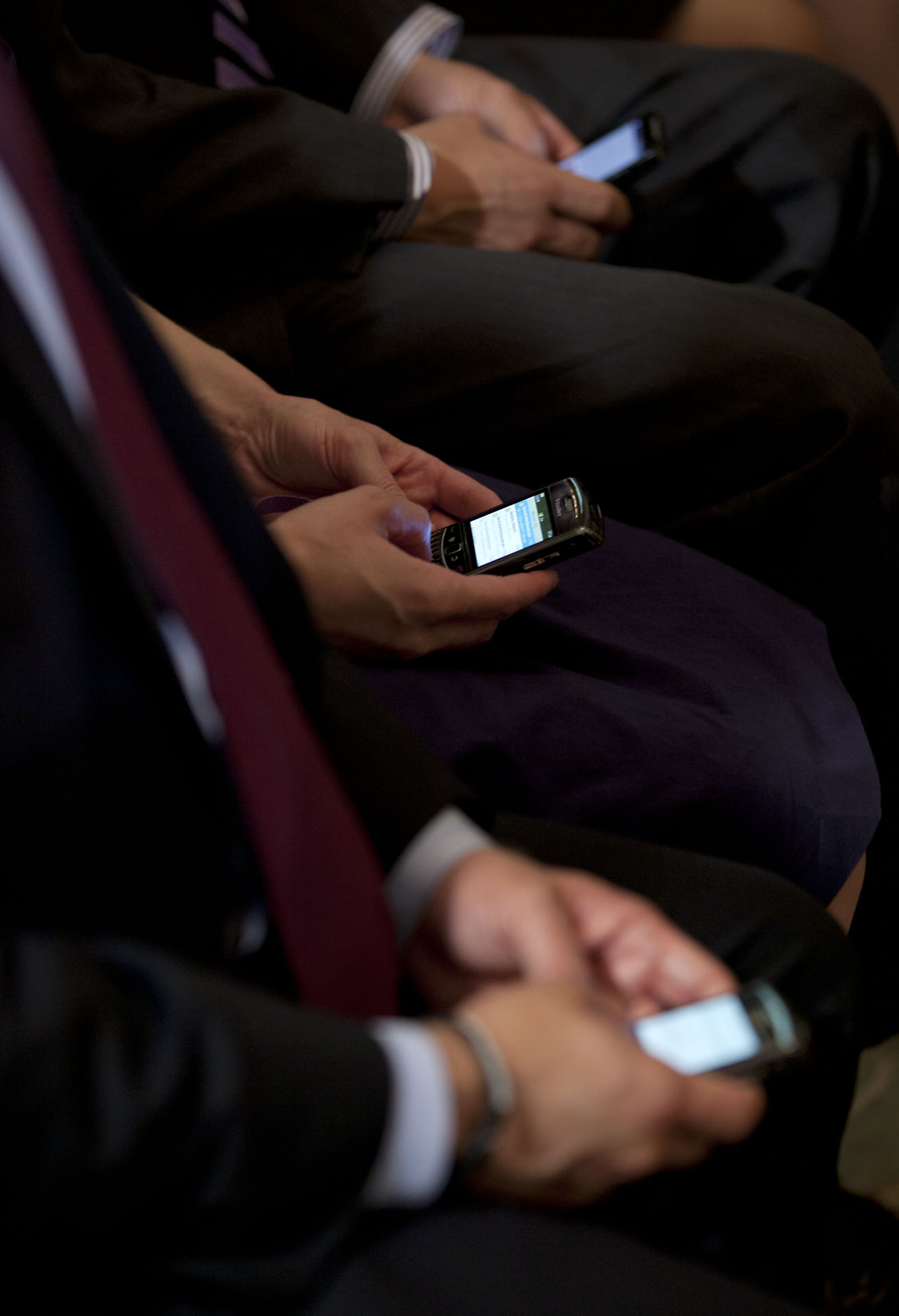
Audience members at the July 6, 2011 Twitter Town hall meeting tweeting questions to Barack Obama

During his presidency, Obama held public forums in which he fielded questions posted on Twitter. On July 6, 2011, he participated in what was billed as "Twitter Presents Townhall @ the White House". The event was held in the East Room of the White House and was streamed online. Only written questions on the site about the economy and jobs were accepted for oral response by Obama. His average responses were over 2000 characters long. Speaker of the United States House of Representatives John Boehner participated by tweeting "Where are the jobs?" to the hashtag #AskObama, and received a response from President Obama. The event was moderated by Twitter executive Jack Dorsey. Dorsey said afterwards that Twitter received over 110,000 #AskObama-hashtagged tweets. On May 24, 2012, Obama again responded to questions on Twitter about his administration's "Congress to-do list".

On July 29, 2011, during the United States debt-ceiling crisis, @BarackObama lost over 40,000 followers when the president urged Americans "to call, email and tweet Congressional leaders to 'keep the pressure on' lawmakers in hopes of reaching a bipartisan deal to raise the nation's $14.3 trillion debt limit ahead of an August 2 deadline." During the day, he sent about 100 tweets that included the Twitter accounts of Congressional Republicans. Later in 2011, Obama used Twitter again to try to encourage the people to voice their opinion on legislation when he was attempting to pass the American Jobs Act.

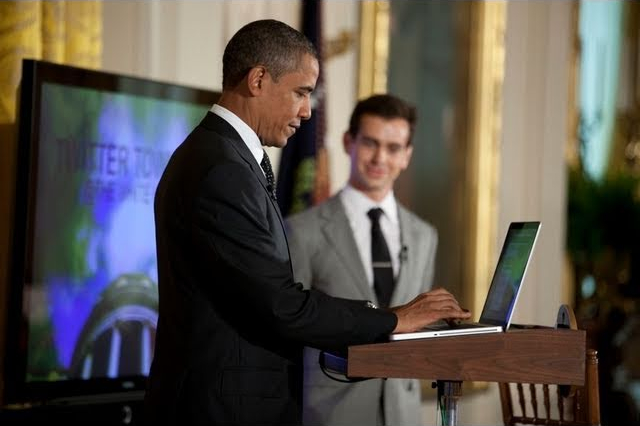
Obama and Jack Dorsey during the July 6, 2011 Twitter town hall meeting

=== Hacking ===
On January 5, 2009, @BarackObama was among several celebrity accounts that were hacked and domain hijacked. The hacker phished the password of a Twitter administrator's account, gaining access to other accounts to which he then changed the passwords, and subsequently offered access to accounts upon request at Digital Gangster. The case eventually led to a non-financial settlement with the Federal Trade Commission by Twitter.

On July 4, 2011, Obama was the subject of a death hoax on Twitter when Fox News' Politics Twitter account (@foxnewspolitics) was hacked. Initially, the hackers started their hoax messages with @BarackObama, thus only making the message appear in the Twitter timelines of those following Fox News and the Presidential account. Eventually, the hackers switched to hashtag references, increasing the visibility of their activities. Fox News acknowledged the breach and apologized.

== Facebook ==
The Barack Obama Facebook page (@barackobama) is currently the official Facebook page for the former president and was his Facebook page during the campaign trail. At the peak of the Obama campaign, his Facebook account had around 3 million friends. In March 2007, the Barack Obama team created an interconnection between a user's account on Obama's official website and their Facebook account, so a user could publish activities by sending postings from one to another. In 2008, the Obama presidential campaign spent $643,000 out of its $16 million Internet budget to promote his Facebook account. On June 17, 2008, after Hillary Clinton ended her campaign, the number of followers of Barack Obama's Facebook account increased to one million. Meanwhile, in addition to the Facebook accounts of Barack and Michelle Obama and Joe Biden, the Obama team created ten Facebook accounts for "specific demographics, such as Veterans for Obama, Women for Obama, and African Americans for Obama."

== Instagram ==
The Barack Obama Instagram (@barackobama), was created on January 3, 2012. It was initially run by his re-election campaign, before he took over and started using it as his personal Instagram account.

== Other social media platforms ==
=== barackobama.com ===
Obama's website was originally run by Chris Hughes, one of the three co-founders of Facebook. Steve Spinner noted that while previous campaigns have used the internet, none had yet taken full advantage of social networking features.

According to Hughes, during the 2008 campaign, over two million accounts were created on the website to "organize their local communities on behalf of Barack Obama." He estimates that more than 200,000 events were organized through the website. Members of the site could create blogs, post photos, and form groups through the website. During the 2008 campaign, 400,000 articles were written in blogs. Four hundred thousand videos that supported Obama were posted on YouTube via the official website. Thirty-five thousand volunteer groups were created. 70,000 people spent thirty million dollars on their fundraising webpages. In the final four days of the 2008 campaign, three million phone calls were made through the website's internet virtual phone.

=== Reddit ===
President Barack Obama made a surprise half-hour visit to the social news website Reddit on August 29, 2012. Using an Ask Me Anything (AMA) format, the President garnered 3.8 million page views on the first page of his self-post. Users left 22,000 comments and questions for the President, 10 of which he answered.

In response to Obama's use of Reddit, many noted bypassing generally established mainstream media channels during the 2012 campaign in favor of less-filtered and closer forms of communication. When asked why Obama logged on to Reddit, one campaign official responded "Because a whole bunch of our turnout targets were on Reddit."

=== Tumblr ===
President Obama created an account on the blog website Tumblr (whitehouse.tumblr.com) in April 2013. On June 10, 2014, Obama held his first Q&A session on Tumblr. The Atlantic thought that Obama got in touch with Tumblr users to prove that he is hip". After the end of his presidency, the blog had been archived on obamawhitehouse.tumblr.com as of January 20, 2017. As with his other social media accounts, the White House Tumblr was passed on to President Trump.

=== Bluesky ===
Barack Obama created a Bluesky account (@barackobama.bsky.social) on March 23, 2025. One of his first few posts he made on the platform was a post celebrating the 15th anniversary of the Affordable Care Act. His account grew rapidly, becoming the 99th most-followed account on the platform on March 25. As of October 18, 2026, it is the 33rd most-followed account on Bluesky.

== See also ==
- Donald Trump on social media
- Fireside chats
- Social media and political communication in the United States

== Bibliography ==
- Hendricks, John Allen; Denton, Robert E. Jr. (2010). Communicator-in-Chief: How Barack Obama Used New Media Technology to Win the White House. Lanham, Maryland: Lexington Books. ISBN 978-0-7391-4107-6.
- Baumgartner, Jody C.; Morris, Jonathan S. (2010). "Who Wants to Be My Friend?". Communicator-in-Chief. pp. 51–66.
- Harfoush, Rahaf (2009). Yes We Did: An Inside Look at How Social Media Built the Obama Brand. Berkeley, California: New Riders—Peachpit. ISBN 978-0-321-63153-4.
