= Mike Masnick =

American blogger (born 1974)

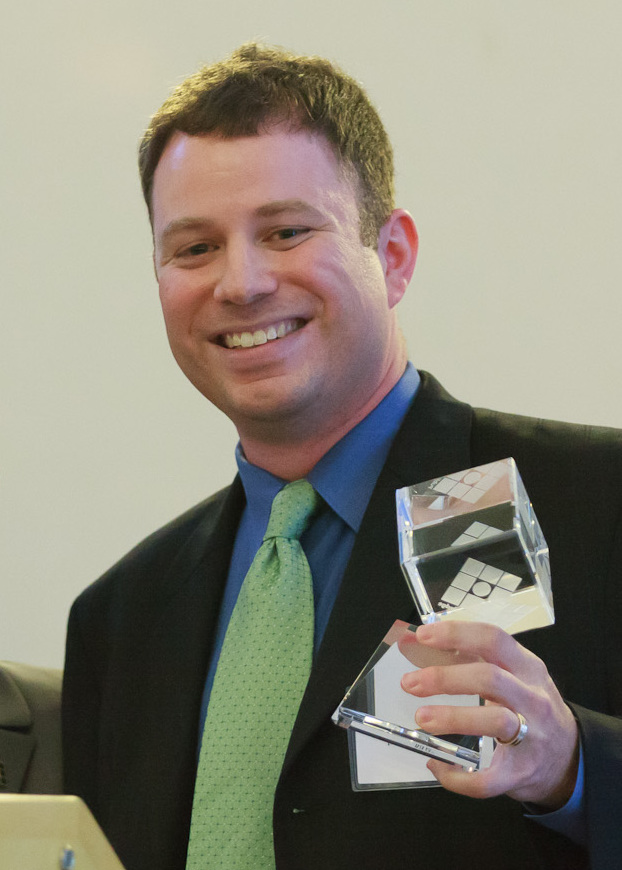
- Masnick at an awards event hosted by Public Knowledge in 2012
- Born: Michael Masnick; December 8, 1974 (age 51); United States
- Occupation: Editor
- Known for: Founder of Techdirt; Participant of SOPA-PIPA debates; Publishing "Protocols, Not Platforms" and inspiring Bluesky; Bluesky board member; Public Knowledge award winner

Michael Masnick (born December 8, 1974) is an American editor and entrepreneur. He is the CEO and founder of Techdirt, a weblog.

He first used the term "Streisand effect" on the Techdirt blog in January 2005 and was interviewed about it three years later on National Public Radio's All Things Considered. In spite of the popularity of the term in the years since, Masnick himself has admitted the term has taken on a meaning of its own without his involvement after making it, and he receives little credit and no royalties for it (as revealed in a satirical article).

In 2010-2012, Masnick played an important role in the SOPA-PIPA debates, "propell[ing] Techdirt into the single most important professional media site over the entire period, overshadowing the more established media."

In a 2019 essay titled "Protocols, Not Platforms", Masnick observed that social media platforms were in a "crisis" of content moderation, being accused both of being too lenient on hate speech and misinformation, and of stifling free speech. Masnick proposed that this could be addressed by developing protocols that allow individual users to filter content according to "their own tolerances for different types of speech." The essay inspired Twitter CEO Jack Dorsey to launch the Bluesky research initiative, which later became a social media startup of its own. In August 2024, Masnick joined the board of Bluesky.
