= Alt National Park Service =

American political group

- Alt National Park Service logo
- Named after: US National Park Service
- Formation: January 24, 2017; 9 years ago
- Website: ourparks.org

The Alt National Park Service (AltNPS) is a coalition of progressive activists created in 2017 in response to restrictions on United States government agencies' social media activity imposed during the first presidency of Donald Trump. AltNPS is active on multiple social media platforms, including Bluesky, Facebook, Instagram, and Threads.

== Origin and growth ==
On January 20, 2017, the official Twitter account of the National Park Service (NPS) retweeted messages that appeared to criticize US President Donald Trump, who had been inaugurated earlier that day. In response, the Trump administration ordered the Department of the Interior, which included NPS, to suspend all social media posting. Similar orders were given to other government agencies, including the United States Department of Agriculture (USDA), the Department of Health and Human Services, and the Environmental Protection Agency (EPA). Despite these orders, the official Twitter account for Badlands National Park posted several messages about climate change on January 24, which were subsequently deleted.

Later on January 24, a previously existing Twitter account called AltUSNatParkService (handle @AltNatParkSer) began tweeting criticisms of Trump and his administration, describing itself as "the Unofficial #Resistance team of U.S. National Park Service". The account's handle was changed to @NotAltWorld on January 27.

Following the acquisition of Twitter by Elon Musk and its subsequent rebranding as X, AltNPS announced on November 24, 2024, that it would no longer be posting to X, and that its "300+ members" were closing their personal X accounts.

In a post to Facebook on February 25, 2025, AltNPS said it had 160,000 "coalition members". As of mid-2025, their social media following included more than four million followers on Facebook and around 900,000 on Bluesky.

== Identity of participants ==
The Twitter account initially described itself as run by multiple NPS park rangers who needed to remain anonymous to avoid reprisals. However, AltNPS posted on January 26, 2017, that no US government employees were involved and that control of the account had been turned over to "several activists & journalists". The group's Facebook page says AltNPS was created by a "coalition" of employees from multiple federal and state agencies, including the Bureau of Land Management, EPA, National Forest Service, USDA, and US Fish and Wildlife Service. Despite considerable speculation and investigation, the identities of who controls or posts on the account have not been proven; it is unclear whether any NPS rangers or other US government employees were involved in the creation of AltNPS. In an article about the #AltGov movement, The Guardian described AltNPS as "parallel to and separate from" AltGov, which checks on prospective members "to make sure people work where they say".

In September 2025, the It Could Happen Here podcast criticized AltNPS as an anonymous "engagement farm" primarily focused on attracting social media followers. Interviewee Jack Joyce, whose "AltWatcher" account on Bluesky comments on AltNPS activity, accused AltNPS of plagiarizing from news sources and posting "vaguely conspiratorial things ... to try to whip up engagement". He also accused AltNPS of making intentionally cryptic social media posts, similar in nature to those created by QAnon accounts, to create the impression of secret communications with federal government insiders and others. Vlogger Rebecca Watson echoed these accusations on her YouTube channel. In a discussion of political dog whistles, philosopher of language Jennifer Saul described the group's practice of posting unexplained "number codes" as "fascinating and somewhat confusing" because they could be either signals to an organized resistance or attempts to mislead readers into thinking that they are.

== Logo ==
Official logo of the National Park Service

Initially AltNPS used the official NPS logo for its Twitter profile picture, but this was quickly abandoned due to concerns about legal liability. A new logo announced on January 26, 2017, used a similar color palette and imagery to the official NPS one. An even more distinct logo, using entirely different colors and images, was adopted the next day. The logo currently used on the AltNPS social media accounts returns to images and colors similar to the official NPS logo. The silhouette of a bison used in the official logo is replaced by a howling wolf. Instead of the arrowhead design used for the overall shape of the NPS logo, the AltNPS logo resembles a raised fist – a symbol of political resistance historically used by multiple protest movements.
