= Social media and political communication in the United States =

In the United States, social media plays an influential role in political communication by political institutions, politicians, private entities, and the general public. The rise of social media in the mid-2000s profoundly changed political communication in the United States, as it allowed regular individuals, politicians, and thought leaders to publicly express their opinions to, and engage with, wide networks of like-minded individuals. As social media activity has grown, the participation of social media users has become an increasingly important element of political communication. The digital architecture of each social media platform influences how users receive information and interact with each other, thereby influencing the political communication strategies employed on each social media platform. Users can connect directly to politicians and campaign managers and vice versa.

Through the use of social media platforms such as Twitter, Facebook, Instagram, and Twitch, politicians can take advantage of financial resources such as crowdfunding. Through crowdfunding, politicians can raise more money for their campaign via social media platforms in significantly less time than would otherwise be achievable with traditional platforms. In 2012, President Obama raised over $1 billion for his campaign, which, at that time, broke the fundraising record. Around $690 million was raised through online donations, including social media, email, and website donations. More money was raised from small donors than ever before.

However, social media campaigns carry risks that are not present on traditional platforms such as TV or newspaper ads. Because of the open nature of information on social media platforms, dissenting opinion can undermine the messaging of social media campaigns in a way that is not present with the use of traditional platforms.

== Influence on elections ==
=== 2004 presidential election ===
==== Howard Dean's campaign ====
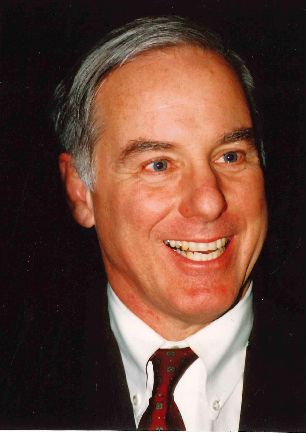
Howard Dean in 1999

Democrat Howard Dean, who served as the Governor of Vermont from 1991 to 2003 and ran for president in the 2004 United States presidential election, is credited with being the first politician to use the Internet for political purposes. Dean won a "digital" primary election that was held on MoveOn.org, getting 44% of the votes. His success in the primary generated positive coverage from the news media. This early victory was important to the campaign's momentum. Dean is credited with organizing the first campaign website, which acted as a virtual headquarters for fundraising and volunteer recruitment. The website also measured several online metrics of success, including hits on his homepage, weblogs, campaign sign-ups, house parties, and meetups.

Additionally, Dean encouraged the use of the website Meetup for his upstart presidential campaign in 2002 to make it easy for people "with a common interest to find each other and arrange to meet, face-to-face." Dean's supporters hosted house parties and invited individuals to learn about Dean's campaign, and individuals would attend face-to-face meetings to learn more about his campaign. A total of about 143,000 individuals attended Dean's Meetups in 600 locations across the country. About 75,000 individuals attended these meetups, with more than 96% of respondents reporting that they wished to become actively involved in Dean's campaign. The engagement in face-to-face local groups "dramatically affected how involved volunteers got with the campaign. The more meetups people attended, the higher their average donation to the campaign".

Dean's campaign was able to raise large amounts of money in small increments. In January 2004, his campaign had raised $41 million, mostly from online supporters. A total of 318,884 individuals contributed to his campaign, with over 61% of the contributions being under $200. Less than 1% of individuals gave $2000, the federal limit. Dean's fundraising behavior was the opposite of his rivals. George Bush raised $130.8 million in 2003, and 68% of his donations were the maximum donation limit.

==== Political origins of Facebook ====
Facebook is a common platform where people interact with each other through social media. An example of what can be done on Facebook is, "an individual creates multimedia content like a video on the cognitive level", which allows for mass interaction between hundreds of people. This free interaction between people on Facebook attracted political figures to use social media to help promote their ideals. The creator of Facebook, Mark Zuckerberg, served as a field organizer for Democrat John Kerry in the 2004 presidential election. Zuckerberg was responsible for get-out-the-vote and other mobilization efforts. Facebook was also launched this same year, on February 4, 2004. The Facebook platform relies on group formation and constant communication, both of which are goals for any political campaign.

=== 2008 presidential election ===
Chris Hughes, a founding member and developer, left Facebook to work as an adviser for Barack Obama. While working at Facebook, Hughes had designed a Facebook profile for the then-presidential candidate. Following his departure, Hughes worked on Obama's Facebook page and used his knowledge of content management and new developments to outpace other candidates' online presence. Hughes created the website MyBarackObama.com, which had a similar concept and layout as Facebook. In the 2008 elections, Facebook continued to be used by electoral candidates. The main user during this election was Obama. Mitt Romney also used Facebook for his campaign, but not as much as Obama did. It is reported that well over 1,000 groups on Facebook were created supporting one of the two sides. In recent years, political figures have been using Twitter more often, but Facebook remains to be a frequently used social media platform.

The 2008 presidential election was the first election where candidates used the Internet and social media as a campaign tool. Nearly three-quarters of Internet users went online to learn more about the candidates in the election; this equates to 55% of the entire adult population. Barack Obama was the first to use the Internet to organize supporters, advertise, and communicate with individuals in a way that had been impossible in previous elections. Obama engaged sites like YouTube to advertise through videos. The videos posted to YouTube by Obama were viewed for 14.5 million hours. Obama's supporters led McCain voters in all categories of online political activism, which was considered by some to be a major factor in his victory.

Young voters were shown to be comparatively more active in online politics. 30% of all those who posted political content online were under the age of twenty-five. 66% of that same demographic voted for Obama, while 33% voted for McCain, showing that Obama's online prominence increased his chances of winning.

In the aggregate, Democratic websites got more views than Republican websites (at least in the primaries). This was due, in part, to younger voters being more inclined to favor the Democratic candidate, as well as being more likely to use the Internet to research and show support for a candidate.

=== 2012 presidential election ===
By the 2012 election, more candidates were using a wider array of social media platforms. Politicians were on social networking sites such as Twitter, Instagram, YouTube, and other new social media tools and mobile apps. Some candidates used social media sites to announce their candidacies. President Barack Obama emailed a video to 13 million users when he announced his intention to run for re-election, and Mitt Romney sent out a tweet. Obama produced a seventeen-minute-long video that was composed of video clips and interviews that documented Obama's first term in office. This video was published on YouTube and allowed the audience to contribute to the campaign without having to leave the website by including a donation link. This efficiency and convenience were key to further extending his fundraising base, which would not have been achieved without the existence of YouTube, as sharing the link would have been more challenging. Other candidates posted on Facebook, Twitter, as well as YouTube, to announce their candidacies.

The candidates ran their campaigns with greater emphasis on the use of social media. Obama and Romney each hired third-party companies to track and analyze data from their websites. This data drove them to each spend nearly $100,000 on online advertisements (Obama spent $93,400 and Romney spent $82,200). Although these numbers are close, in the aggregate, Obama spent more than Romney did on digital campaigns by a factor of ten: Obama spent $47 million and Romney spent $4.7 million.

Obama had a much larger digital presence than Romney throughout the campaign. In October 2012, Obama had over 20 million followers on Twitter, while Romney had 1.2 million. On Facebook Obama had over 29 million likes on his page, while Romney had 7.9 million. On Instagram Obama had 1.4 million followers, while Romney had 38,000. Obama had a higher following on all of his other social media accounts, including Spotify, Pinterest, and YouTube. Research suggests, however, that merely following Obama or Romney on social media sites like Facebook may have had little influence on voter behavior. Obama also engaged with his social media accounts more than any other candidate online. He actively posted more on Twitter, YouTube, and on a personal website blog.

In both 2008 and 2012, Obama's campaign thrived on online donations. In 2008, around 3.95 million people donated to his campaign. During his 2012 campaign, that number increased to 4.4 million people. The total online amount also rose from $500 million in 2008 to $690 million in 2012.

Research on Twitter during the 2012 U.S presidential election found that political issues were widely discussed throughout their platform. Chris Vargo found that Twitter helped spread and connect discussions about political issues during the election. This shows that social media has become an important way to get people connected and to gather and discuss political information.

Social media was also used as a source to get news about the U.S presidential election during this period. Research by Gil De Zuniga and colleagues found a connection between using social media to get news and civic engagement and to get people participated politically. This suggests that social media can help people learn about the current political issues and connects them closer so that they are involved in politics.

Other political figures used social media to accomplish tasks such as showing support for a presidential candidate. New Jersey governor Chris Christie tweeted his support for Obama in the 2012 election. At the time, he boasted an 80% approval rating, which led undecided voters to support Obama.

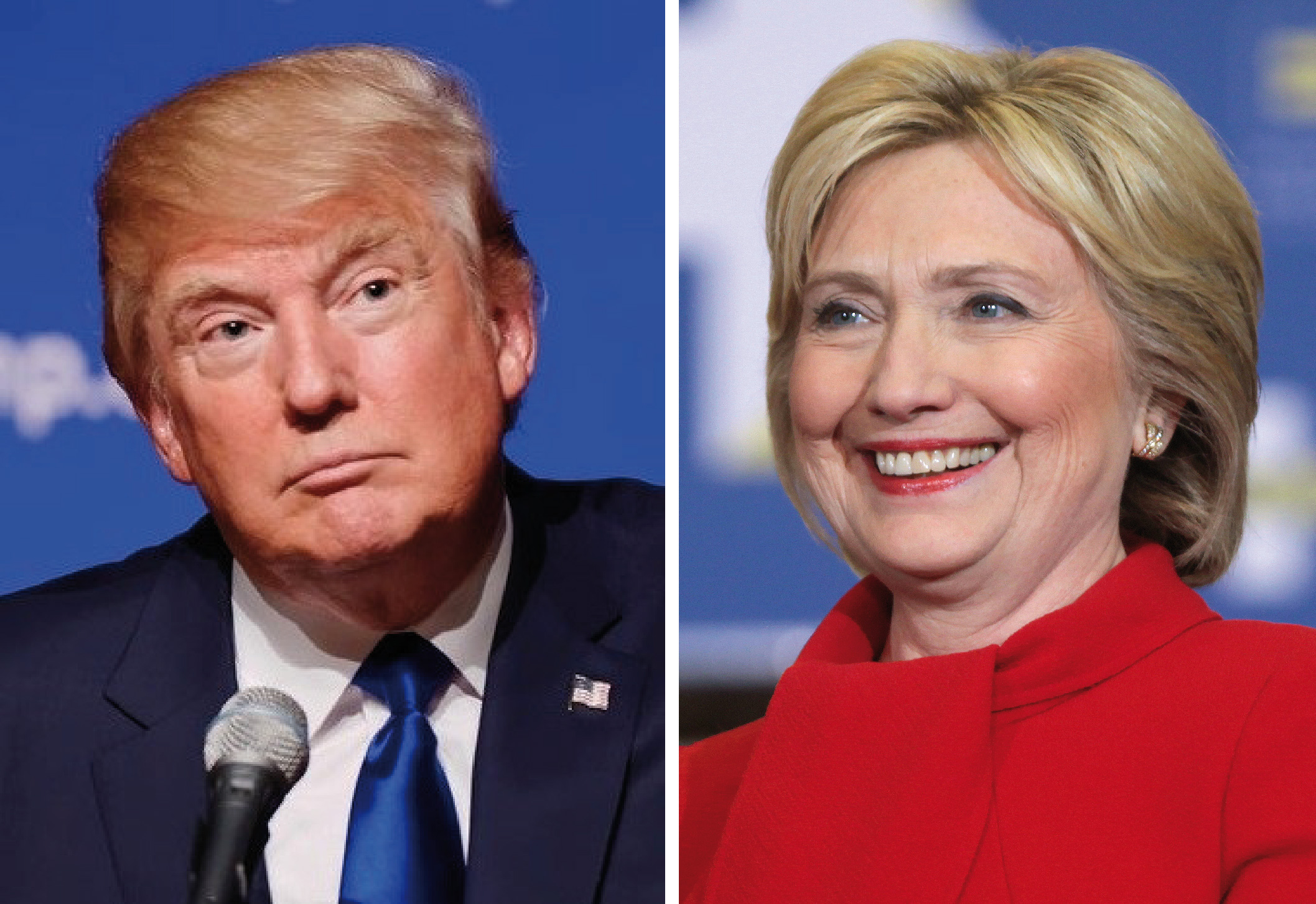
Donald Trump and Hillary Clinton

=== 2016 presidential election ===
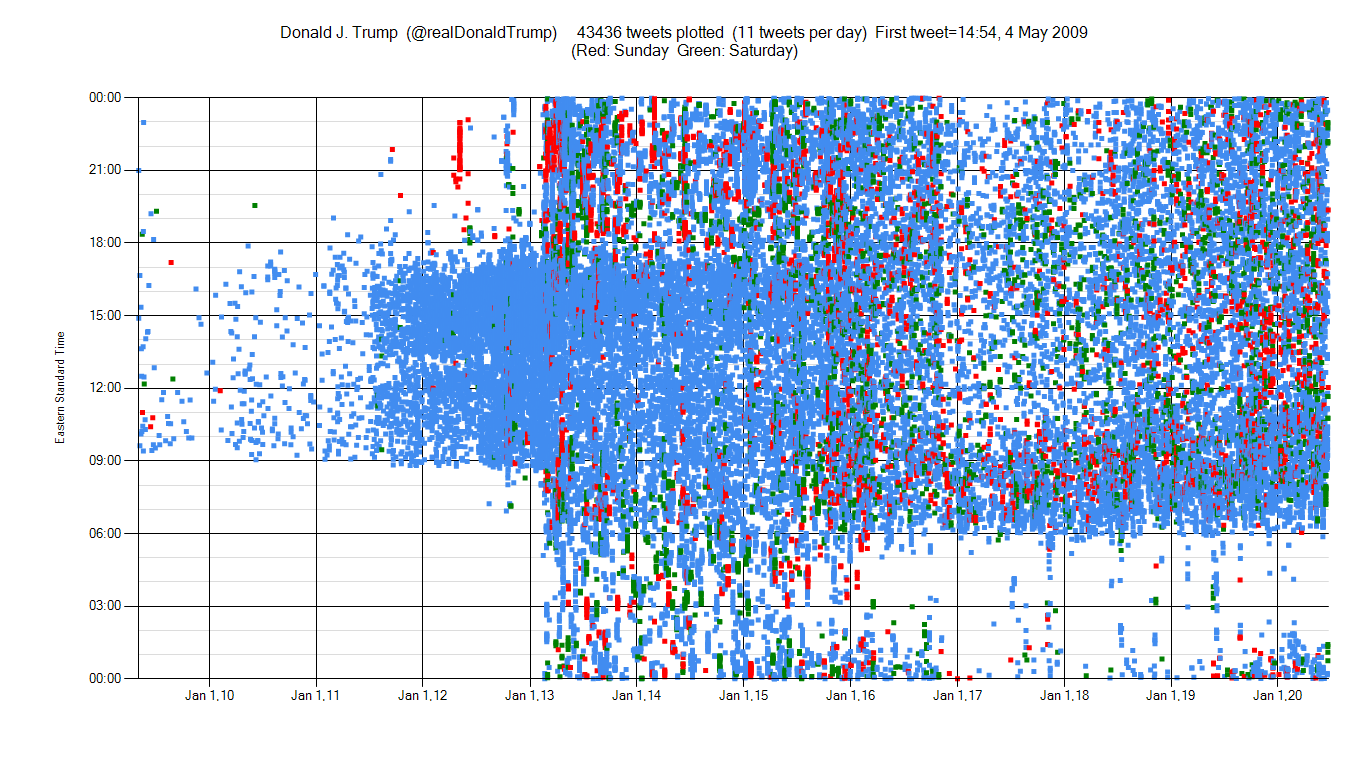
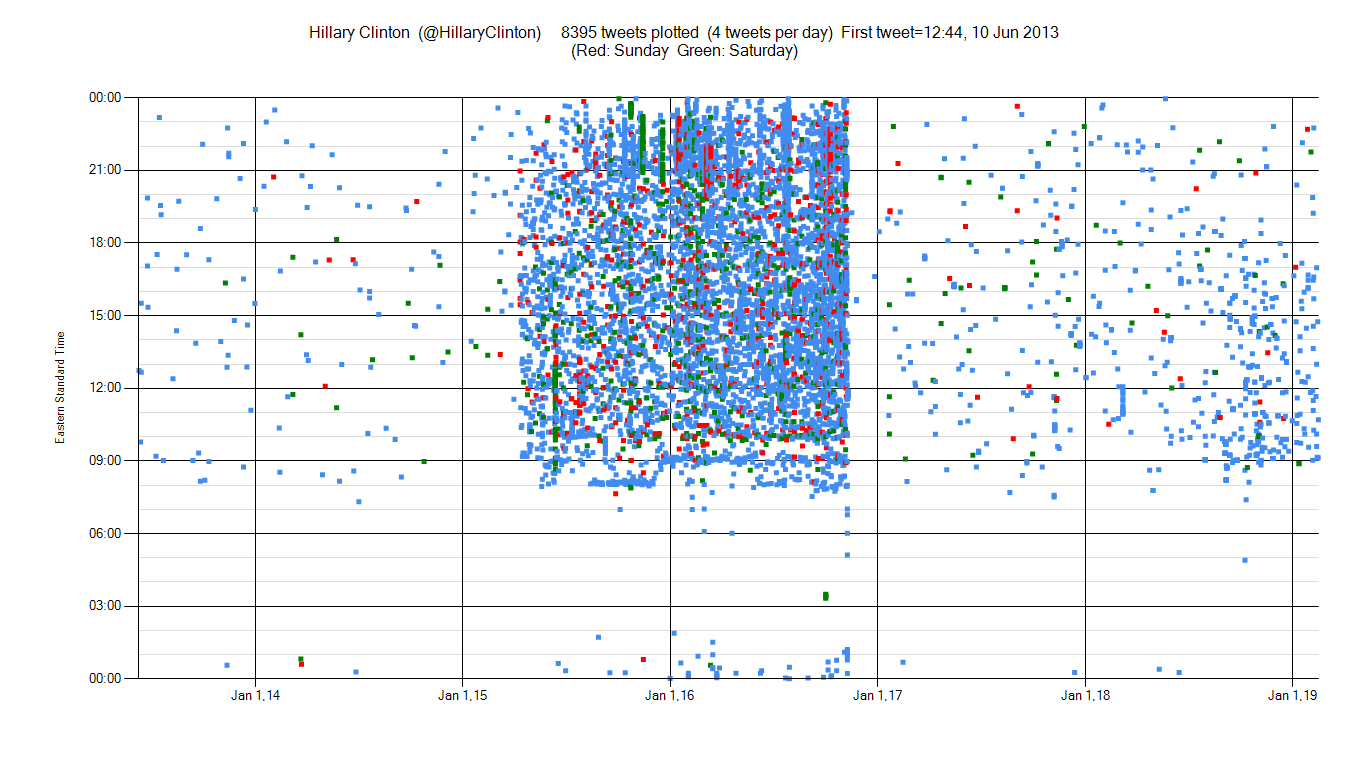
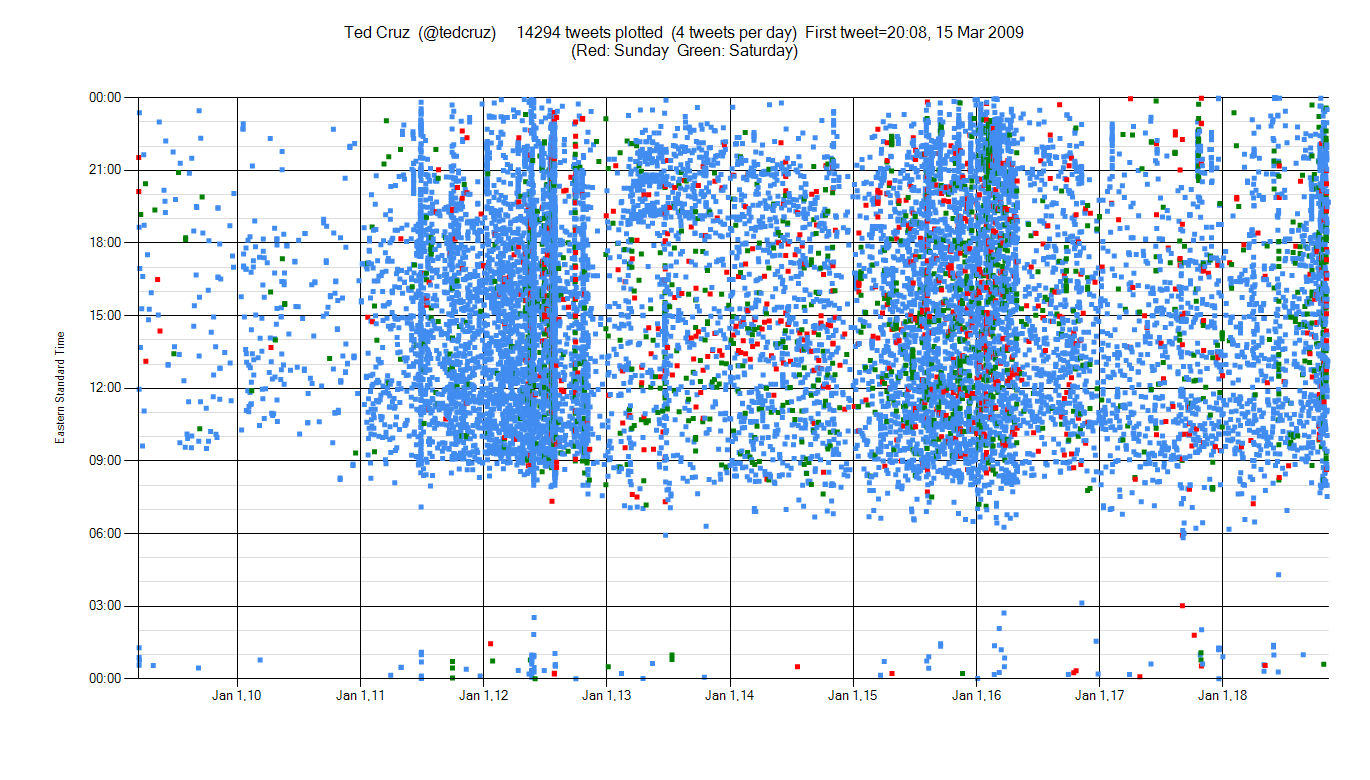
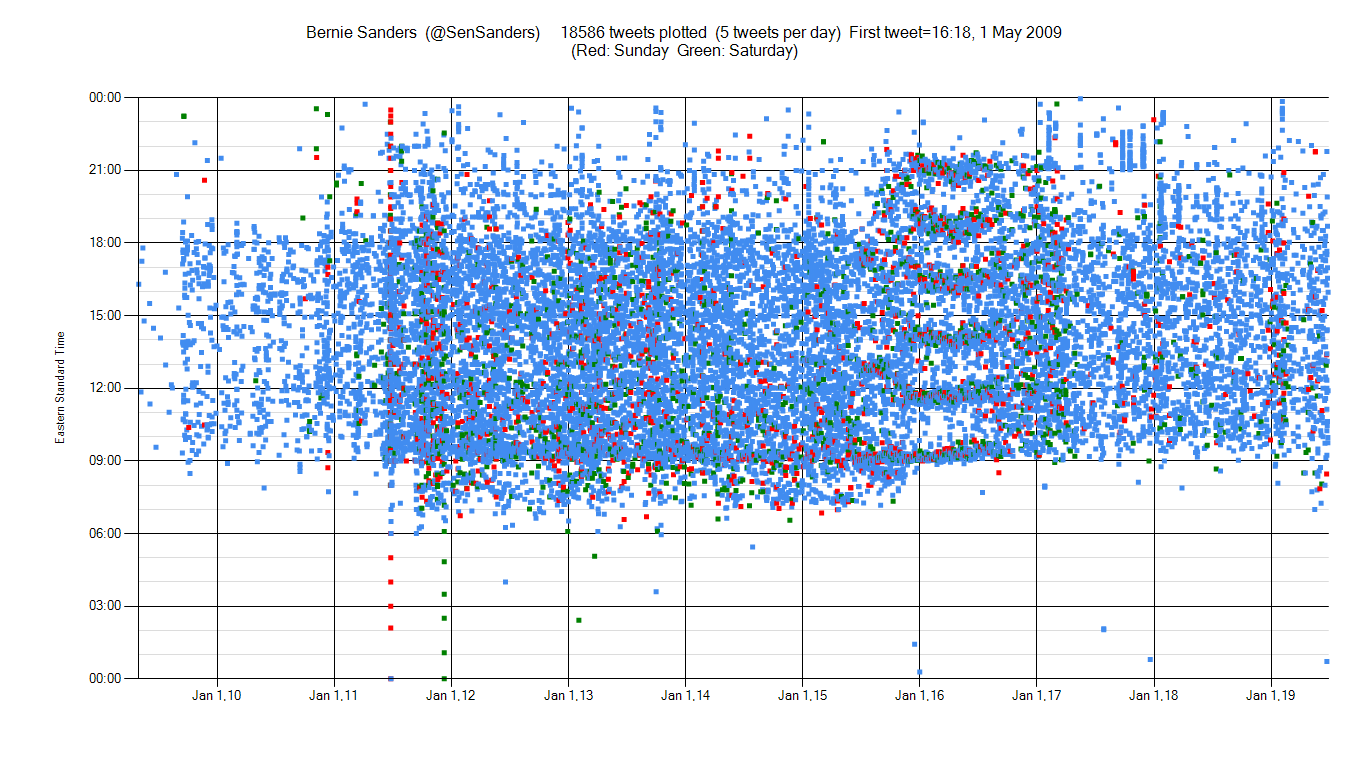
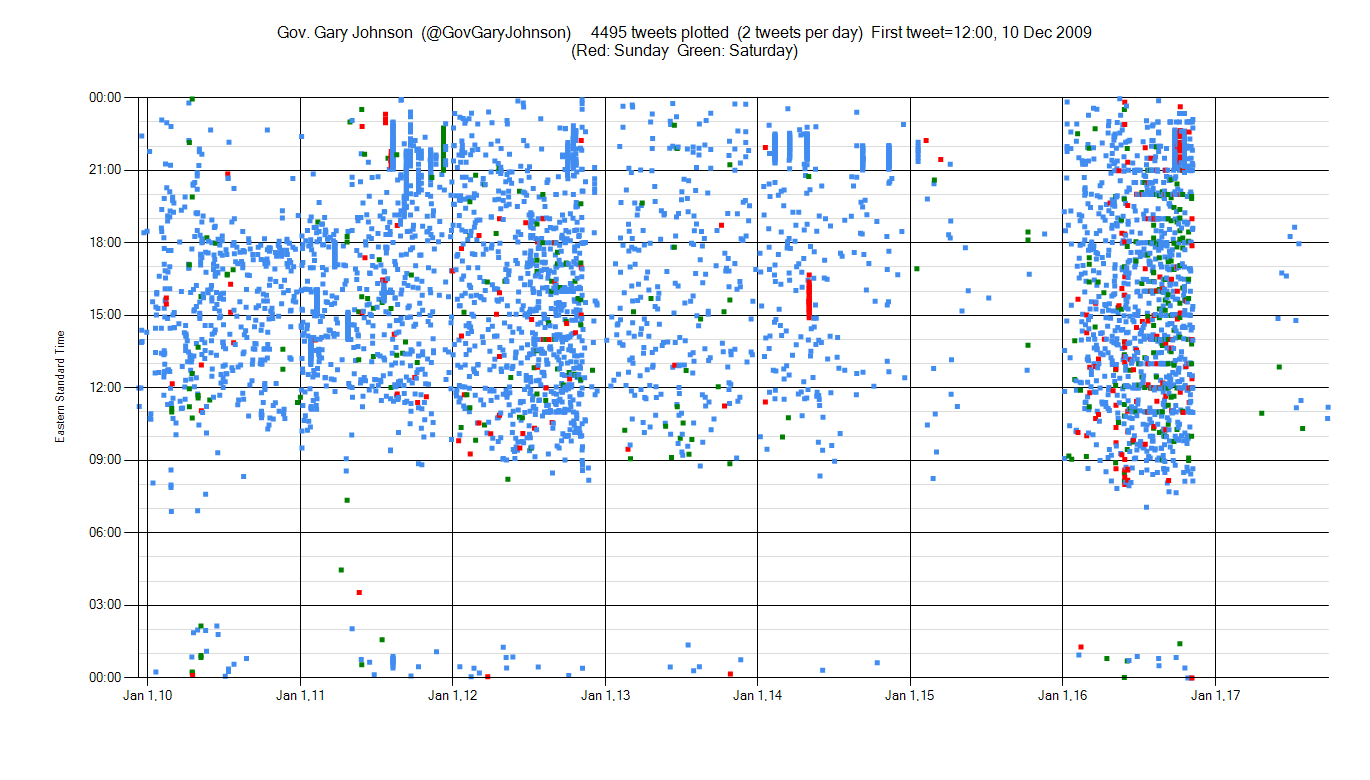
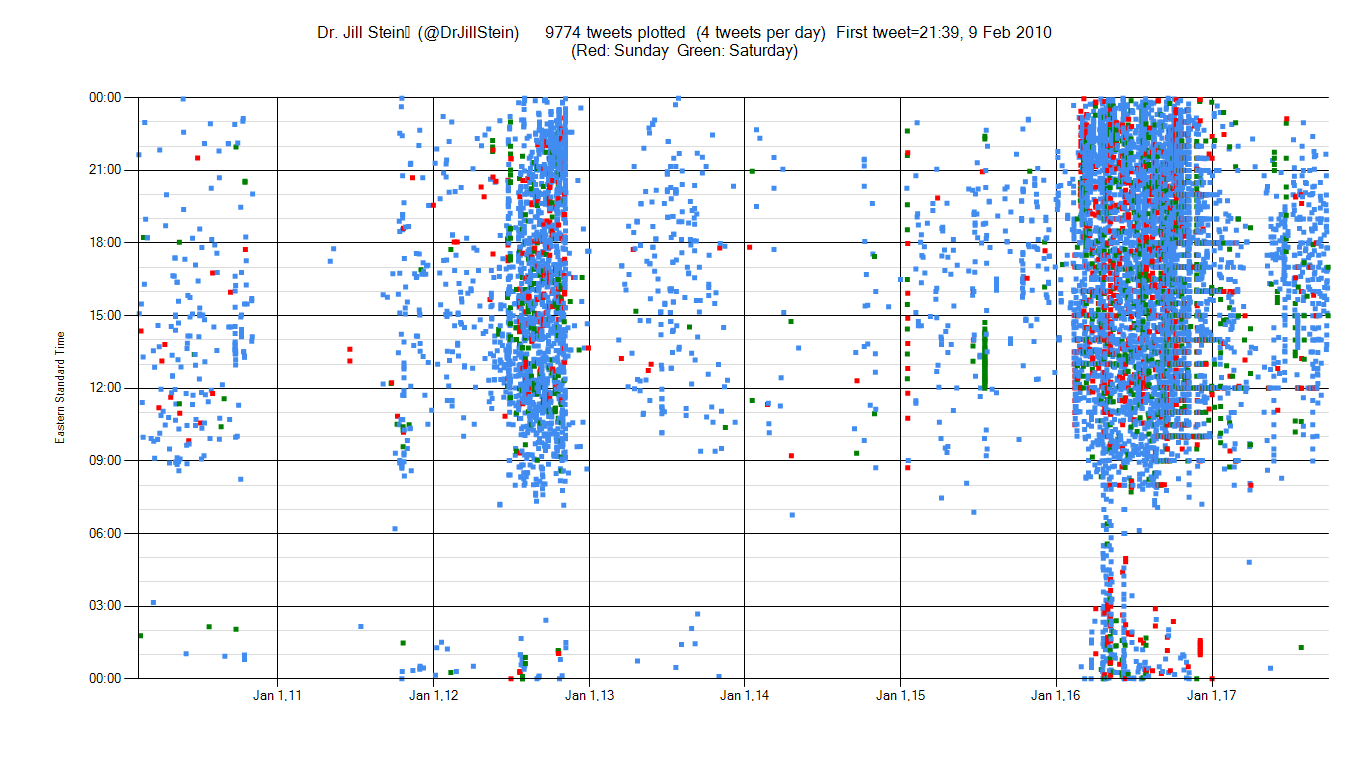
Graphs of the Twitter activity of (from top) Donald Trump, Hillary Clinton, Ted Cruz, Bernie Sanders, Gary Johnson, and Jill Stein

The 2016 presidential election saw heavy use of social media by all candidates. The top three candidates were Donald Trump, Hillary Clinton, and Bernie Sanders (the runners-up in the Democratic primary). The Pew Research Center reported that "in January 2016, 44% of U.S. adults reported having learned about the 2016 presidential election in the past week from social media." Roughly "24% say they have turned to the social media posts" for information regarding the election.

In the 2016 election, Twitter was the main platform for both Trump and Clinton, the two major-party nominees. Trump had higher number of Twitter followers at 11.9 million compared to Clinton's 9.3 million. Trump has posted over triple the tweets as Clinton at 32,800 tweets while Clinton has just 7,260 tweets. In 2020 alone, Trump tweeted or retweeted more than 12,000 times. The candidates used social media differently. While Trump's posts focused on links to news sources—such as Fox News or The New York Times, to get their attention—Clinton and Sanders focused on "highlighting official campaign communities" and promoting their own campaigns.

On Twitter, Trump also tended to retweet tweets from the general public, whereas Clinton and Sanders mainly retweeted tweets about their campaigns. Trump and Clinton tweeted about each other several times. Clinton used the "@" feature of Twitter, linking users to Trump's page. Trump referred to Clinton several times, but he rarely used the "@" feature.

Some of Clinton's and Sanders' posts were written in Spanish. The two Democratic candidates actively reached out to the Hispanic community, while Trump made no posts in Spanish. Trump yielded 29% of Latino voters while Clinton received 65%.

Of the three candidates, Trump had received more responses from users than the two Democratic candidates. This could have been because Trump had more followers at the start of the campaign.

==== 2016 Candidates' Social Media Perceptions ====
The content that presidential candidates and media outlets covered throughout all forms of media leading to the 2016 Presidential Election was crucial to both candidates' campaigns. A study conducted utilizing Gallup's daily polling that asked people if they had read anything about Presidential candidates Clinton and Trump. This study was to investigate how impressions towards political candidates among people are created based on the media they interact with. The study covered both news and Twitter commentary; they found that when asked about what they had read about Presidential candidate Clinton, the word 'email' and 'FBI investigation' was the most prominent word associated with her campaign in the weeks leading to Election Night.

Whereas Presidential candidate Trump was most associated with 'tax', and 'women' leading up to Election Night. Commentator Cillizza points out that the role of the media exacerbating Clinton's email shaped how people perceived Clinton, arguing that the Gallup study can be used as the Democrats justification for losing the 2016 election. This is primarily because there was an increase of people asked about what they heard about Clinton the key word 'email' was most used in the short weeks leading to the election.

The results of the study demonstrated how instrumental news coverage and Twitter commentary is in shaping public perception of candidates. However, Trump who was mainly perceived with the words of 'debate', 'people', can be attributed as neutral within the media. In this case, the coverage of the FBI investigating created negative public perception to the Clinton campaign. The outcome to the 2016 can be attributed to how the public maintained a negative perception, however Cillizza argues that the negative perception of the email scandal can not be the primary factor of Clinton losing the election.

==== Immigrant Perceptions in Donald Trump's 2016 Campaign ====
Public opinion over the topic of immigration is motivated by how much one perceives the issue of immigration to be important enough to be the main reason they vote. For instance, right-wing populism in Western Europe has benefitted from having an anti-immigrant platform, leading to an increase in electoral support. In the United States, Alexander Kustov found that voters who held strong anti-immigrant beliefs, thought anti-immigration politics to be most important. In 2016, anti-immigration preferences was most salient compared to people who were pro-immigrant. However, public opinion has demonstrated that there are more people who support pro-immigration reforms and policy, yet there are more people who find anti-immigration to the main factor that drives them to vote.

In 2018, a study by the Pew Research Center concluded that news outlets and Twitter (now X) significantly fueled the topic of immigration. On Twitter, the topic of immigration was published the most by prominent news outlets such as the NYTimes and CNN. The communication of immigration had also trickled into Trump's presidency and was continuously published throughout Twitter. Trump's campaign platform and administration promoted anti-immigrant policies- during Trump's campaign to presidency, he promised to shut down entry of Muslims into the United States. By the time he came into office, he signed an executive order banning Muslims from entering the country.

=== 2020 presidential election ===
During the 2020 presidential election, the use of social media by candidates, campaigns, and other stakeholders was considerable, playing an even larger role than in previous presidential races. The 2020 election took place during the rise of COVID-19. Thus, candidates had to rely on social media for campaigning more than they did in the past. The two main candidates in this election were Donald Trump Republican candidate and Joe Biden Democratic candidate. The Trump campaign spent $48.7 million and the Biden campaign spent $45.4 million on Facebook ads alone. Other candidates, such as Kanye West and Andrew Yang also generated large amounts of buzz on social media. During the 2020 election Kanye West put out a fake tweet stating that he beating both Donald Trump Republican candidate and Joe Biden Democratic candidate. During the 2020 election, Andrew Yang used social media as his primary way of campaigning because his demographic of voters was younger individuals. Andrew Yang also gained the most social media followers during the 2020 election compared to any other candidate.

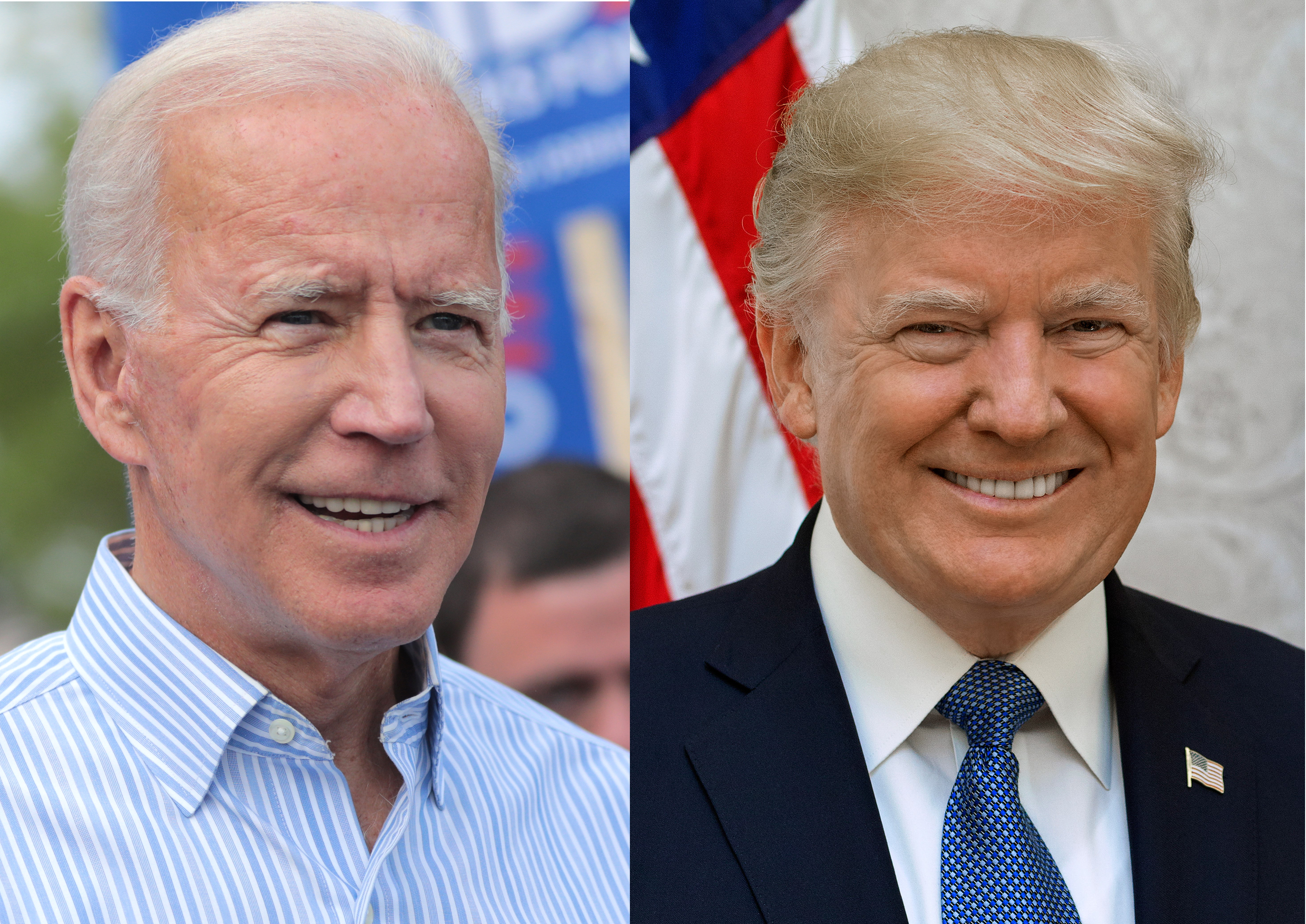
Joe Biden and Donald Trump

During the 2020 election, on social media, there was the rise of influencers and celebrities participating in activism on political topics. Celebrities such as LeBron James, Taylor Swift, and Beyonce made statements supporting democratic candidate Joe Biden. Celebrities such as Stacey Dash, Kid Rock, and Kirstie Alley came out with statements in support of Republican candidate Donald Trump.

Social media caused many controversies during the 2020 election. During the 2020 election, social media was the primary source of the spread of false information. Social media users also faced polarization due to social media algorithms, creating an echo chamber for social media users and only exposing themselves to their own beliefs. Facebook and Twitter, however, are facing intense criticism from lawmakers for their roles in politics, a criticism that is tied to antitrust concerns. A report from the House Judiciary subcommittee on antitrust stated, "In the absence of competition, Facebook's quality has deteriorated over time, resulting in worse privacy protections for its users and a dramatic rise in misinformation on its platform." In response to these issues, Facebook has taken action and announced that it will not run any political ads in North America.

After the election was formally called for Biden by media agencies ranging from CNN to Fox News, Donald Trump proceeded to contest the 2020 election results' authenticity, using social media platforms, while also contesting it via multiple lawsuits. Although all the lawsuits were unsuccessful, Donald Trump's social media campaign and Stop The Steal initiative during this period is perceived by many to have culminated in the 2021 storming of the United States Capitol. This ultimately led to Donald Trump's Twitter account being shut down by Twitter, which cited a breach of their usage policy. However 22 months later, Donald Trump's Twitter account was reinstated. Despite being reinstated on Facebook and Twitter, Donald Trump launched his own social media app, Truth Social, on February 21, 2022.

=== Truth Social ===
After Trump's suspension from Facebook and Twitter, now "X", in 2021 he formed his own social media and technology site named "Truth Social." The site officially launched in February 2022.

=== Limitations and constraints ===
Social media has been used in political campaigns ranging from small local elections to large-scale presidential elections. According to Wael Ghonim, social media can reinforce pre-existing beliefs rather than promote new ones. While social media can be used to raise money, several candidates focused on using it to promote their campaigns. Politicians cannot control the conversation on social media. According to a study by Miguel del Fresno García, Alan J. Daly, and Sagrario Segado Sánchez-Cabezudo, regular friends and followers have more influence on social media than blogs and campaign pages. Users with the most influence fall into three different categories: users who disseminate knowledge, those who engage other people, and those who lead conversations. These three types of users are the ones whom others tend to follow and listen to. Therefore, for political campaigns to truly reach as many people as possible, political groups first need to get those three users talking about their campaigns on social media. With the many ways social media can be used in political campaigns, many U.S. social media users claim they are drained by the influx of political content in their feed.

Overuse of social media might lead to less lawmaking as more effort is put into gaining supporters. Due to the surplus of misinformation throughout news stories, social media may undermine the credibility of campaigns. This spread of misinformation caused 64% of Americans to be confused over basic facts. Andrea Calderaro wrote that social media allows online knowledge to spread easily ‘giving space to unqualified voices’. This could threaten the quality of political news by replacing the presumed authenticity and impartiality of professional journalists with possibly unreliable sources of information; during the 2016 election, "just below 55%" of online news was false. The political astroturfing approach defined by Jacob Ratkiewicz is a system that allows unqualified voices to gain influence through social media. Here, political campaign spams are disguised as grassroots behavior, when, in reality, the information is being spread by a single person or organization. The strategy seeks to build a "false sense of group consensus" about an idea so it will spread consistently by avid group supporters. This makes it easier for like-minded citizens to form filter bubbles which essentially isolate them from opposing contrary perspectives.

The political news circulated within one's bubble may be filled with one-sided fake news, allowing certain politicians to gain popularity through false pretenses. For example, throughout the 2016 election, 115 pro-Trump fake stories were shared 30 million times in comparison to the 41 pro-Clinton fake news stories that were shared only 7.6 million times. Some argue, such as Jill Lepore in the New Yorker, that this influence went as far as to tamper with election results. Circulation of Trump's fake news stories grew, such as one where wtoe5news.com reported that Pope Francis had endorsed Donald Trump's presidential candidacy. This may have allowed his right-wing populism to grow. As more fake news about Trump circulates online, filter bubbles will be more successful in shaping the worldview of voters.

=== Social media algorithms ===
Through their algorithms and user behavior, social media platforms contribute significantly to the creation of ideological echo chambers, limiting exposure to diverse political opinions. Sunstein (2001, 2017) argues that the Internet and social media promote environments where individuals mainly encounter content that aligns with their preexisting beliefs, preventing meaningful engagement with opposing viewpoints. Halberstam & Knight (2016) show that Twitter networks during the 2012 U.S. elections were characterized by homophily, or the tendency to form connections with those who share similar political views.

The debate over whether filter bubbles and online ideological segregation directly lead to political polarization remains controversial. However, evidence suggests that social media plays a role in deepening partisan divides. Studies by Yanagizawa-Drott et al. (2020) show that online networks, particularly those with stronger political homophily where users predominantly connect with individuals who share similar political views—are linked to increased political polarization. The more users interact with particular types of content, the more they are likely to encounter similar material, creating a cycle where their worldview becomes increasingly reinforced. This effect contributes to the fragmentation of online spaces, where echo chambers form and ideological segregation becomes more pronounced, particularly in spaces with stronger political homophily. This effect is more pronounced in regions where partisan divides are already substantial, highlighting that social media platforms may exacerbate pre-existing political tensions. Further, social media platforms create environments where users are not only exposed to like-minded individuals but also to echo chambers that amplify extreme political views. This amplification effect is clear when considering the algorithmic design of platforms like Facebook and Twitter, where content is tailored to users' preferences and interactions (Gentzkow & Shapiro, 2011). The fragmentation of online spaces often magnifies political polarization by increasing the visibility of extreme perspectives. As online communities become more ideologically segregated, they reinforce users' preconceptions and further entrench partisan identities, making it more challenging to engage in cross-ideological dialogue. Additionally, it is important to consider the factor of algorithmic personalization, which is a data driven process employed by social media platforms to customize content based on user behavior. However, this can lead to the amplification of certain views, influencing public perceptions of opinion in a way that doesn't necessarily reflect their real proportions. This effect can create misperceptions of public opinion, reinforcing existing beliefs and limiting exposure to diverse perspectives.

== Scandals ==
Political scandals have been a part of the American political system since its inception (see List of federal political scandals in the United States). Such scandals are events that capture a lot of attention, at first creating intense public commentary that eventually disappears from the mainstream media, which has been heavily involved in reporting past scandals. In recent decades, scandals relating to the Internet and social media have increased and which are less about illegal or corrupt activities than about what used to be private misdeeds. The first political scandal related to social media was the political demise of Congressman Anthony Weiner in 2011. Weiner, a Democrat from New York, sent a link, to a suggestive photograph, to a woman on his public Twitter account. The tweet and pictures were then sent to Andrew Breitbart, a conservative blogger, who posted them on his website before Weiner had a chance to take the tweet down. Within days the Anthony Weiner incident became national news. The scandal, nicknamed Weinergate, is considered to be the first sex scandal on social media involving a politician. The Affordable Care Act (ACA), most commonly known as Obamacare faced criticism due to transparency discrepancies. The Oversight Committee is dedicated to ensuring that Americans are informed about how their tax money is used and how much Washington takes from them for the intended purposes. The committee holds the government accountable to taxpayers to ensure transparency. Critics in mainstream media claimed the accessibility and how Obamacare was labeled as affordable was concealed and the money taken from taxpayers was not implemented for the commonwealth.

Political scandals affecting election outcomes have come about as a result of social media use. Joe Miller, a Senate candidate from Alaska, tweeted about decorating his office before winning his race. Miller deleted the tweets, but not before a blogger was able to capture screenshots of them. Miller eventually lost the election. Meg Whitman, a Republican candidate in California, was embarrassed by a tweet sent by her press secretary that included a YouTube video of a cross-dressed musician. Whitman lost her race to Jerry Brown. Pete Hoekstra, a Michigan Congressman, got into trouble after tweeting confidential details during a trip to Iraq, thereby breaching security. Politicians have become more vulnerable to scandals as their lives become more public on social media.

Among the political scandals of Trump's presidency was the alleged Russian interference in the election through social media. There is broad agreement that Russians working for the Internet Research Agency used a variety of social media platforms to attempt to influence election outcomes. In June 2023 Trump was indicted after taking classified national defense documents from the White House after leaving office. Congressional subpoenas were issued seeking those presidential documents, but Trump resisted those government attempts to retrieve them. Congressional investigation charged Trump with “conspiracy” on multiple accounts. The effects of social media scandals can be seen in the polarization of the country on this issue. 90% of Democrats were reported to have no confidence in Trump's ability to handle the investigation of Russia effectively, whereas only 23% of Republicans were reported to have no confidence in his ability to do so. On the other hand, 36% of Republicans indicated that the Mueller investigation was important, whereas 87% of Democrats indicated it was. When politicians use social media platforms like Twitter, they are more likely to be circulated and attract attention if they have extremist views, this is known as the "echoing effect". This effect refers to the “highly fragmented, customized, and niche-oriented” nature of social media and how the algorithm caters to one's beliefs. This echoing effect is contributing to the levels of extremism and polarization we see in social media and makes it so we see less of moderate views on these platforms. An example of this is Trump's presidency, he used social media “as a method of fighting back” against so-called fake news stories. His extreme messages on Twitter contributed to him accumulating 14 million followers. This idea of fake news has left Americans feeling confused about the political atmosphere. A Pew Research study found that 64% of Americans felt confused about “basic facts.” Fake news stories such as pizza-gate have blown up in recent years. In the case of pizza-gate, it led a man to walk into a Washington D.C pizza shop with a gun to look for a child predator ring. These fake news stories can go to create confusion among the population, and in cases such as pizza gate; it can even be dangerous.

Social polarization is fragmenting a society previously envied by other parts of the world, as 92% of Republicans are to the right of the median Democrat, and 94% of Democrats are to the left of the median Republican.

== See also ==
- Social media use by Barack Obama
- Social media use by Donald Trump
- Fake News in the United States
- Post-Truth Politics#Social Media and the Internet
- Social media use in politics
- Social media in the 2020 United States presidential election
