= Jay Graber =

American software engineer (born 1991)

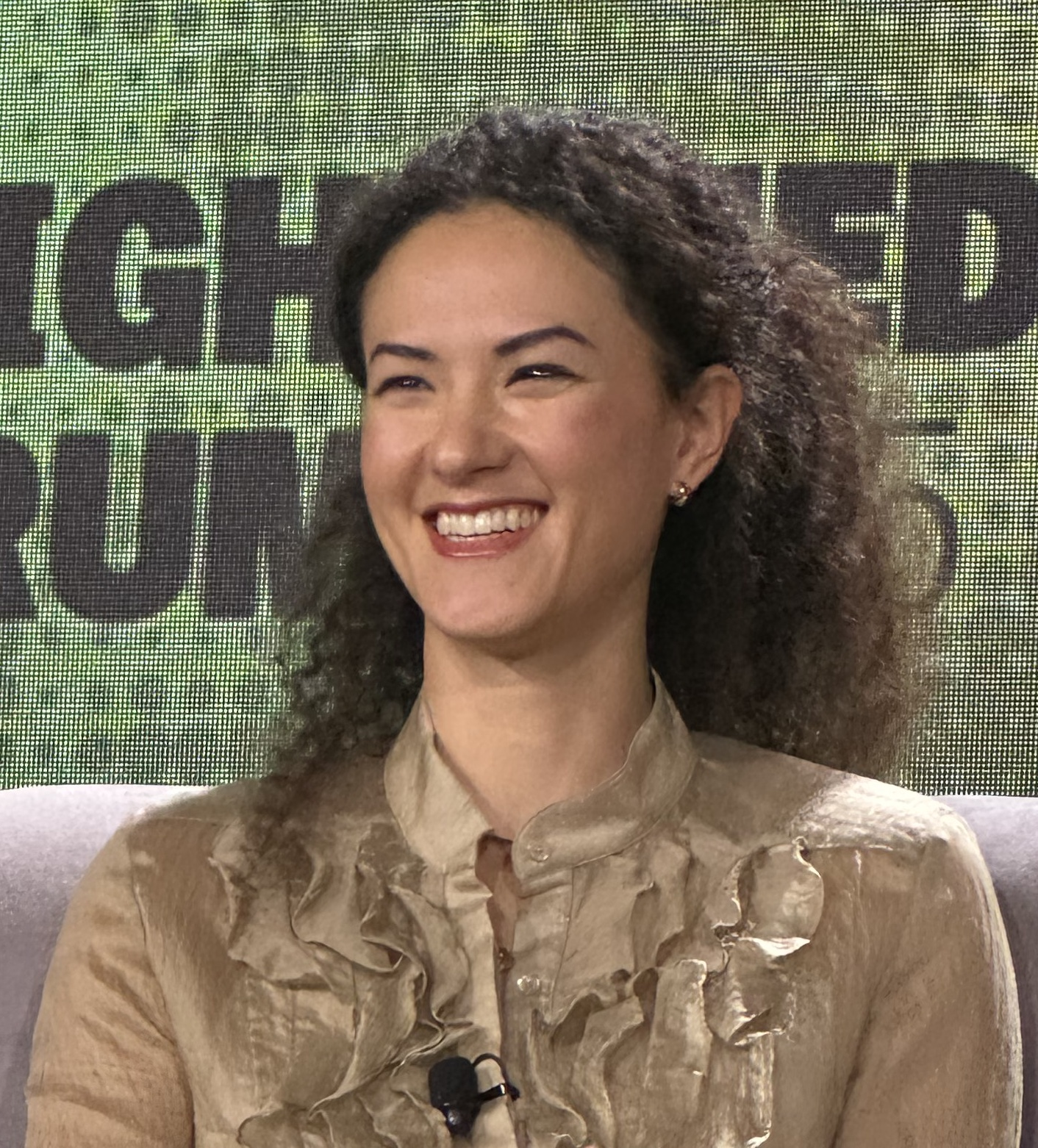
- Graber in February 2025
- Born: Lantian Graber; 1991 (age 34–35); Tulsa, Oklahoma, U.S.
- Education: University of Pennsylvania (BA)
- Occupation: Software engineer
- Years active: 2014–present

Lantian "Jay" Graber (born 1991) is an American software engineer who served as the first CEO of Bluesky, a microblogging social platform. In March 2026, she stepped down as CEO to become Bluesky's chief innovation officer.

== Early life ==
Lantian Graber was born in 1991 in Tulsa, Oklahoma, to a mother of Chinese descent, an acupuncturist by trade, and a mathematics teacher father of Swiss descent. Her mother, who grew up in China during the Cultural Revolution and emigrated in the 1980s, named her daughter Lantian (蓝天), meaning "blue sky" in Chinese, as a wish for her to have "boundless freedom". The similarity between Graber's given name and Bluesky is purely coincidental; Jack Dorsey had chosen the name "Bluesky" for the research initiative before Graber became involved with the project.

Graber enrolled in the University of Pennsylvania in 2009 and later graduated in 2013 with a BA in Science, Technology, and Society. During her senior year she won a grant to co-found a student time bank program.

== Career ==
In 2015, Graber began working as a software engineer for SkuChain in Mountain View, California. She then worked in a factory in Moses Lake, Washington, where she soldered bitcoin mining equipment. In 2016, she began working as a junior developer for the Zcash cryptocurrency. In 2019, she founded the event planning website Happening, Inc.

In August 2021, Graber became the first CEO of Bluesky, a microblogging social platform and public benefit company. Bluesky had been conceived as a new initiative by Twitter's original owners in 2019 that Twitter would work with, but evolved to become a competitor to Twitter following the 2022 acquisition of Twitter by Elon Musk and the subsequent severing of ties between Bluesky and Twitter. During her tenure as CEO of Bluesky, Graber facilitated the launch and rise of their Bluesky social app and its rise to over 40 million users.

Notably, in a 2025 interview at South By Southwest, Graber made headlines for her shirt with the Latin words mundus sine caesaribus 'a world without caesars', which resembled a shirt Mark Zuckerberg had worn months earlier with the Latin phrase aut Zuck aut nihil 'a Zuck or nothing', a play on the phrase "either Caesar or nothing". The move by Graber was received as a jab at Zuckerberg and tech billionaires, and a nod to Bluesky's promise of being "billionaire-proof".

In March 2026, Graber announced she would be stepping down as CEO of Bluesky and moving to the role of chief innovation officer for the company. While a permanent replacement has not been chosen, venture capitalist Toni Schneider serves as the current interim CEO.
