= Bluesky =

Social platform

- Logo since December 2023

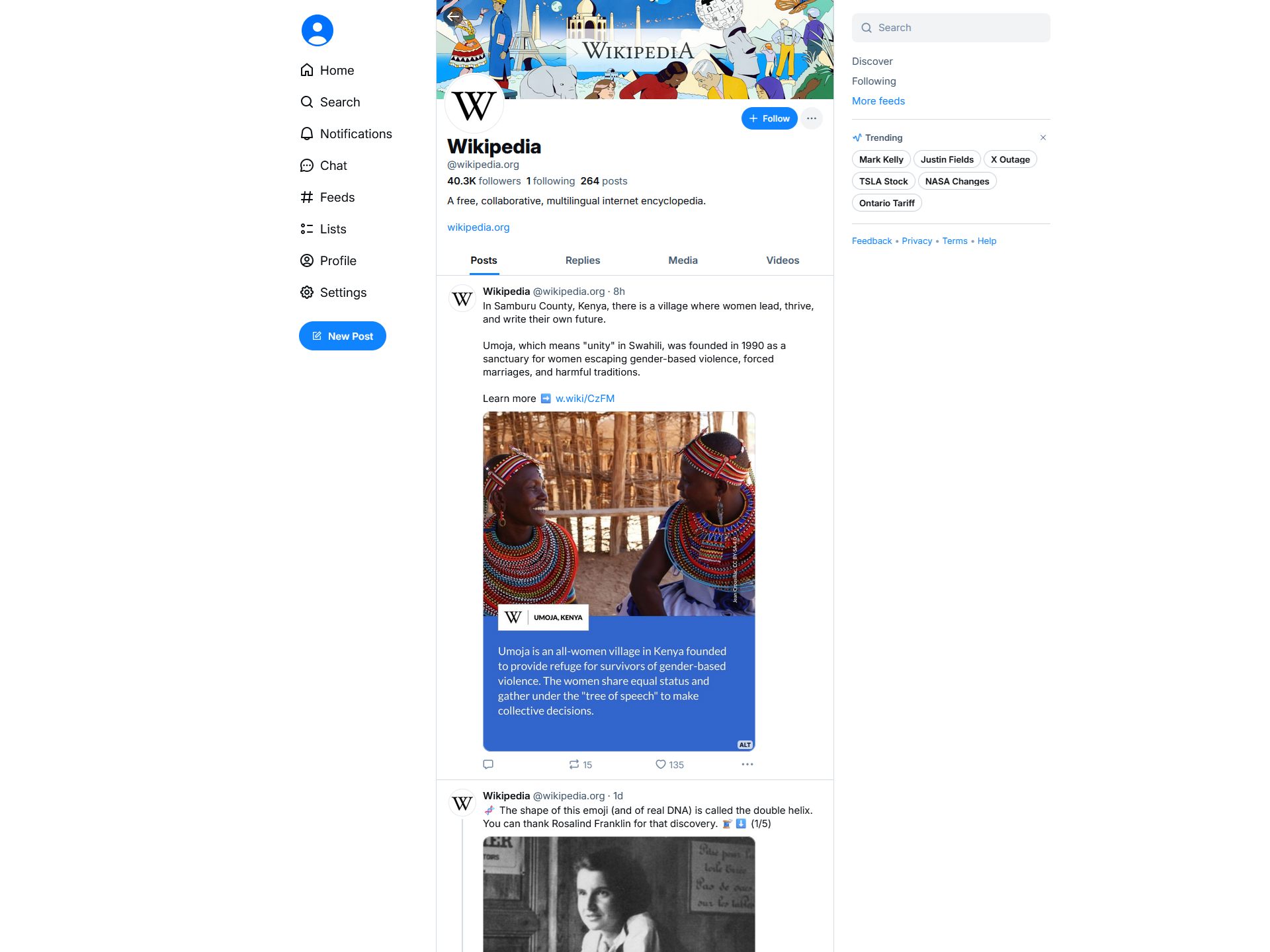
- Screenshot of the Bluesky desktop interface, featuring the account of the English Wikipedia, March 2025
- Website type: Social networking service
- Available in: 41 languages (Note: Aragonese; Asturian; Basque; Cantonese; Catalan; Chinese (Simplified and Traditional); Danish; Dutch; English (American and British); Esperanto; Finnish; French; Frisian; Galician; German; Greek; Hindi; Hungarian; Indonesian; Interlingua; Irish; Italian; Japanese; Khmer; Korean; Nepali; Polish; Portuguese (Brazilian and European); Romanian; Russian; Scottish Gaelic; Spanish; Swedish; Thai; Turkish; Ukrainian; Vietnamese; Welsh)
- Founded: 2019 (employed by Twitter); 2021 (fully independent)
- Headquarters: Seattle, Washington, United States
- Area served: Worldwide
- Owners: Bluesky Social, PBC
- Founder: Jack Dorsey
- Key people: Jay Graber; Jeremie Miller; Mike Masnick; Toni Schneider (CEO); Rose Wang; Kinjal Shah
- Employees: 29 (September 2025)
- Website: Social media bsky.app About bsky.social
- Registration: Required
- Users: Over 47 million total registered users (as of 14 October 2026)
- Launched: February 17, 2023 (invitation-only); February 6, 2024 (public release)
- Current status: Active
- Native clients on: Web; Android; iOS
- Written in: TypeScript, Go
- ASN: 19317

Bluesky (abbreviated as Bsky) is an American microblogging social media service. Users can share short posts containing text, images, and videos. It is owned by Bluesky Social PBC, a benefit corporation based in the United States.

Bluesky was developed as a reference implementation of the AT Protocol, an open communication protocol for distributed social networks. Bluesky Social promotes a composable user experience and algorithmic choice as core features of Bluesky. The platform offers a "marketplace of algorithms" where users can choose or create algorithmic feeds, user-managed moderation and labelling services, and user-made "starter packs" that allow users to quickly follow a large number of related accounts within a community or subculture. The AT Protocol offers a domain-name–based handle system within Bluesky, allowing users to self-verify an account's legitimacy and identity by proving ownership of a domain name.

Bluesky began in 2019 as a research initiative at Twitter, Inc., becoming an independent company in 2021. Development for the social app accelerated in 2022 after Elon Musk's acquisition of Twitter and subsequent severing of ties between the companies. Bluesky launched as an invitation-only service in February 2023 and opened registrations in February 2024. Former Twitter CEO Jack Dorsey left Bluesky Social's board in May 2024. The social media platform experienced a surge in activity in November 2024. As of September 2025, Bluesky had 1.5 million daily active users, down 40% from March 2025, when the network had 2.5 million daily active users. The site is used predominantly by left-wing and liberal users.

== History ==
=== Research initiative ===
Avatar of jack⚡️

jack⚡️
(@jack)
tweeted:

Twitter is funding a small independent team of up to five open source architects, engineers, and designers to develop an open and decentralized standard for social media. The goal is for Twitter to ultimately be a client of this standard. 🧵

Dec 11, 2019

Jack Dorsey, then-CEO of Twitter, Inc., first announced the Bluesky initiative in 2019 on the Twitter platform to explore the possibility of decentralizing Twitter. The stated goal was to find or develop an open and decentralized standard for social media that would give users more control over their data and experience. Dorsey was inspired by an essay by Mike Masnick, titled "Protocols, Not Platforms", which observed that social media platforms were in a "crisis" of content moderation where they were being accused both of being too lenient on hate speech and misinformation and of censoring free speech. Masnick (who would later become a board member of Bluesky Social) proposed that this could be addressed by developing protocols that allow individual users to filter content according to "their own tolerances for different types of speech."

Twitter collected a working group of experts in decentralized technology in a Matrix group chat to achieve a consensus on the best path towards decentralization. However, this group did not achieve consensus toward these goals. As a result, Twitter decided to field individual proposals from these experts.

In early 2021, Bluesky was in a research phase, with 50 people from the decentralized technology community active in assessing options and assembling proposals for the protocol. This ultimately led to the hiring of Jay Graber in August 2021 to lead the Bluesky project and the development of the "Authenticated Data Experiment" (ADX), a custom-built protocol made for the purpose of decentralization. Twitter provided $13 million in initial funding to the Bluesky project to begin development.

=== Incorporation and independence from Twitter ===
In October 2021, Graber incorporated the Bluesky project as an independent company called "Bluesky Social", and cited Twitter's "very entrenched existing incentives" as a reason to operate independently. Bluesky Social became a benefit corporation in February 2022, with the mission to "develop and drive large-scale adoption of technologies for open and decentralized public conversation". The company's first three employees were hired in March 2022.

After Elon Musk's acquisition of Twitter, Inc., Twitter severed all legal and financial ties with Bluesky Social. Musk's takeover did not immediately affect Bluesky Social's operations as a separate entity, but affected its prospects for further funding. Bluesky Social developed the AT Protocol, alongside a reference implementation in the form of a social media service, as a minimum viable product. The company began a waitlist for this service in October 2022.

=== Invitation-only open beta ===
Bluesky was launched as an invitation-only iOS beta on 17 February 2023. In April 2023, it was released for Android. Soon after the launch of the Android app, the social network claimed about 50,000 users. Code for the app was made open source under the MIT license in May 2023, with some server software being dual-licensed with the Apache license. Bluesky garnered media attention soon after its launch due to its close association with Twitter and Dorsey.

The social service attracted minority communities and subcultures, including black, artist, left-wing, transgender, sex worker, and furry communities, who benefited from the invitation system. These early communities are often credited for the platform's historically left-leaning culture and its implementation of robust community management and moderation features. Bluesky Social recognized the influence of these early adopters, with Bluesky COO Rose Wang stating that an early goal during the open beta period was to "develop and nurture a set of power users who can help evangelize and help us really tell [...] and reinforce the culture" established by these communities.

On July 5, 2023, Bluesky Social announced it had raised $8 million in a seed funding round led by Neo. Bluesky Social pledged to use the funds to grow its team, manage operations, pay for infrastructure costs, and further develop the AT Protocol. The company also announced its conversion to a benefit corporation.

In July 2023, Bluesky experienced a controversy after users discovered the social app did not prevent users from using racial slurs within their handles, and had removed discriminatory slurs from the platform's list of flagged words. This led to a "posting strike" by users, in which users refused to use the app until Bluesky Social addressed the controversy. The controversy led to a public apology from Bluesky Social, an update to the platform's terms of service specifying a prohibition of conduct that "targets people based on their race, gender, religion, ethnicity, nationality, disability, or sexual orientation", and the establishment of a trust and safety team within the company.

In December 2023, Bluesky Social announced a company logo to replace the previous use of a cloudy sky stock image, which was also used as the icon for the official app and website. This icon was a blue butterfly, inspired by existing users' usage of the butterfly emoji to indicate their handles on the service.

=== Public launch ===
The total number of registered users on Bluesky increased markedly after its February 2024 public launch, rising from 3.14 million to 5.1 million in one month.

Bluesky opened registrations to the general public on February 6, 2024, a year after its release as an invitation-required beta. It opened federation to the social app through the AT Protocol soon afterwards, allowing users to build apps within the protocol and provide their own storage for content sent to Bluesky Social.

On May 4, 2024, Dorsey posted on Twitter, which was under the process of rebranding to X, that he was no longer on Bluesky Social's board. Bluesky Social confirmed his departure the next day. Dorsey had previously deleted his account from the platform and vouched his support for both X and Nostr, another decentralized protocol. In an interview, Dorsey criticized Bluesky Social, stating that they were "literally repeating all the mistakes [Twitter/X] made as a company", taking issue with Bluesky Social's company structure and the introduction of moderation tools into the AT Protocol.

In October 2024, Bluesky announced a $15 million Series A financing round led by Blockchain Capital. The company pledged to not integrate cryptocurrency into the social app or the AT Protocol, so as to not "hyperfinancialize the social experience".

== Growth in usership ==
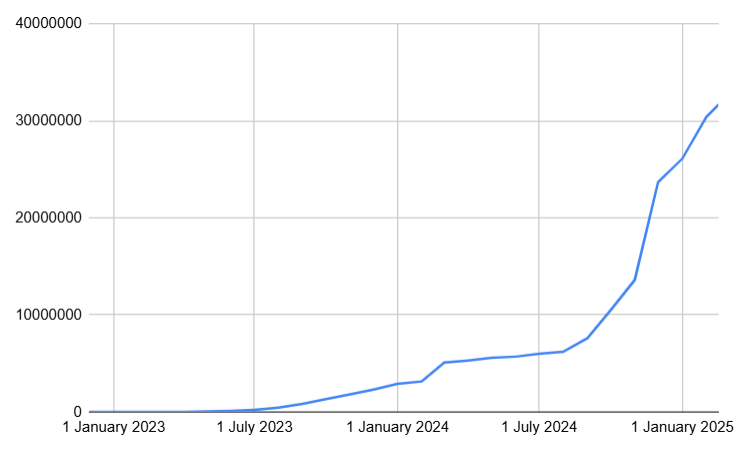
The total number of registered users on Bluesky increased from approximately 200,000 in July 2023 to over 30 million by February 2025, with a marked increase in late 2024.

=== During invitation-only open beta ===
Bluesky saw rapid growth during its open beta period in 2023, reaching 1 million registered users by September 2023 and surpassing 2 million users in November of that same year.

By the time of its public launch in February 2024, the social app had reached over 3 million users.

=== After public launch ===
Bluesky has experienced several bursts of expansion and contraction following its public launch in February 2024, mainly in relation to controversies and changes at X. These bursts were referred to as "Elon Musk Events", or EMEs, by developers at Bluesky Social.

Bluesky saw a large influx of registrations by Japanese-speaking users soon after public launch, partly driven by notable Japanese social media personalities such as artist Ui Shigure registering accounts in the platform.

In August 2024, following the blocking of X in Brazil, Bluesky gained over four million users in under two weeks, becoming the most popular app in the Brazilian App Store and Play Store. Shortly afterwards, on September 16, Bluesky announced it had reached ten million users. Daily active users in Brazil decreased to under two million by October.

In October 2024, following changes to X's block feature and Terms of Service to analyze users' content for AI training purposes by default, over 1.2 million users joined Bluesky within two days. On October 24, Bluesky Social announced it had reached 13 million users.

=== Post–2024 United States presidential election growth ===
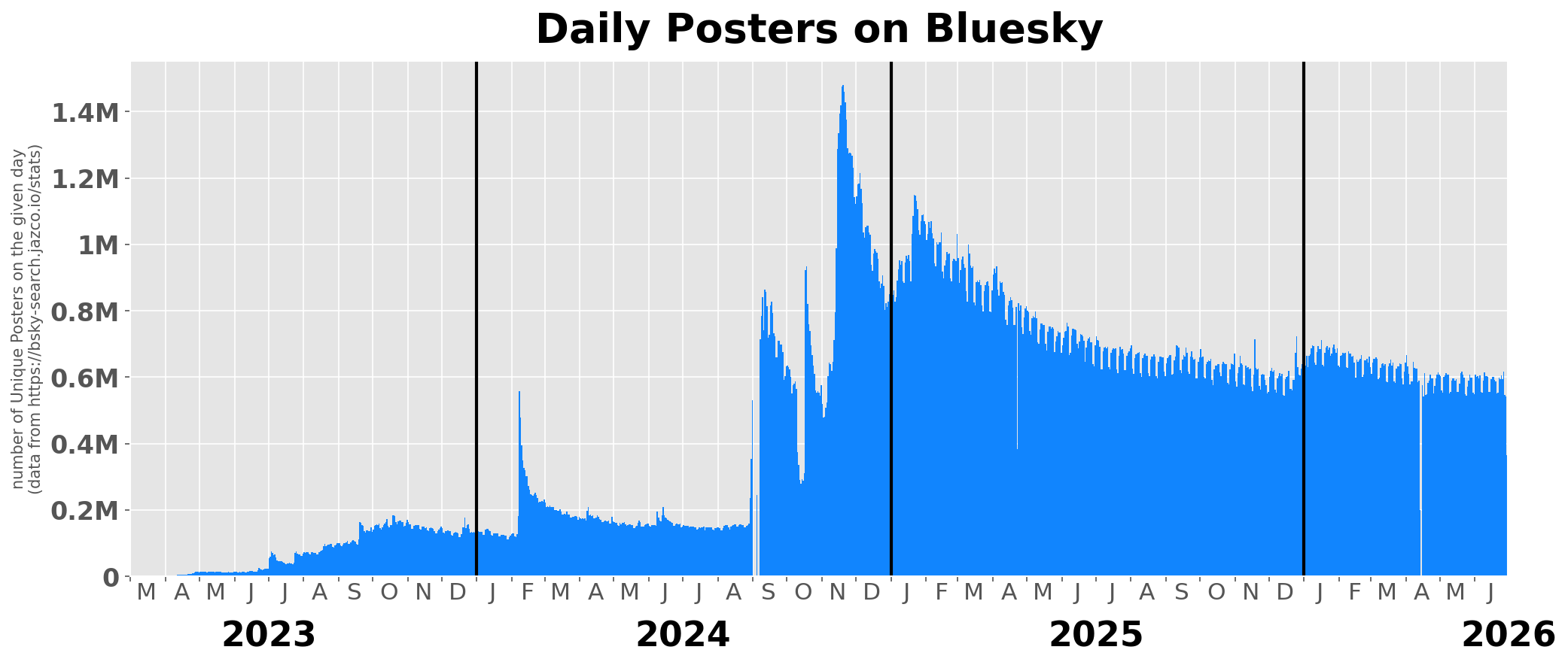
The number of unique posters per day on Bluesky over time, showing spikes around the November 2024 US presidential election and the January 2025 inauguration of US president Donald Trump

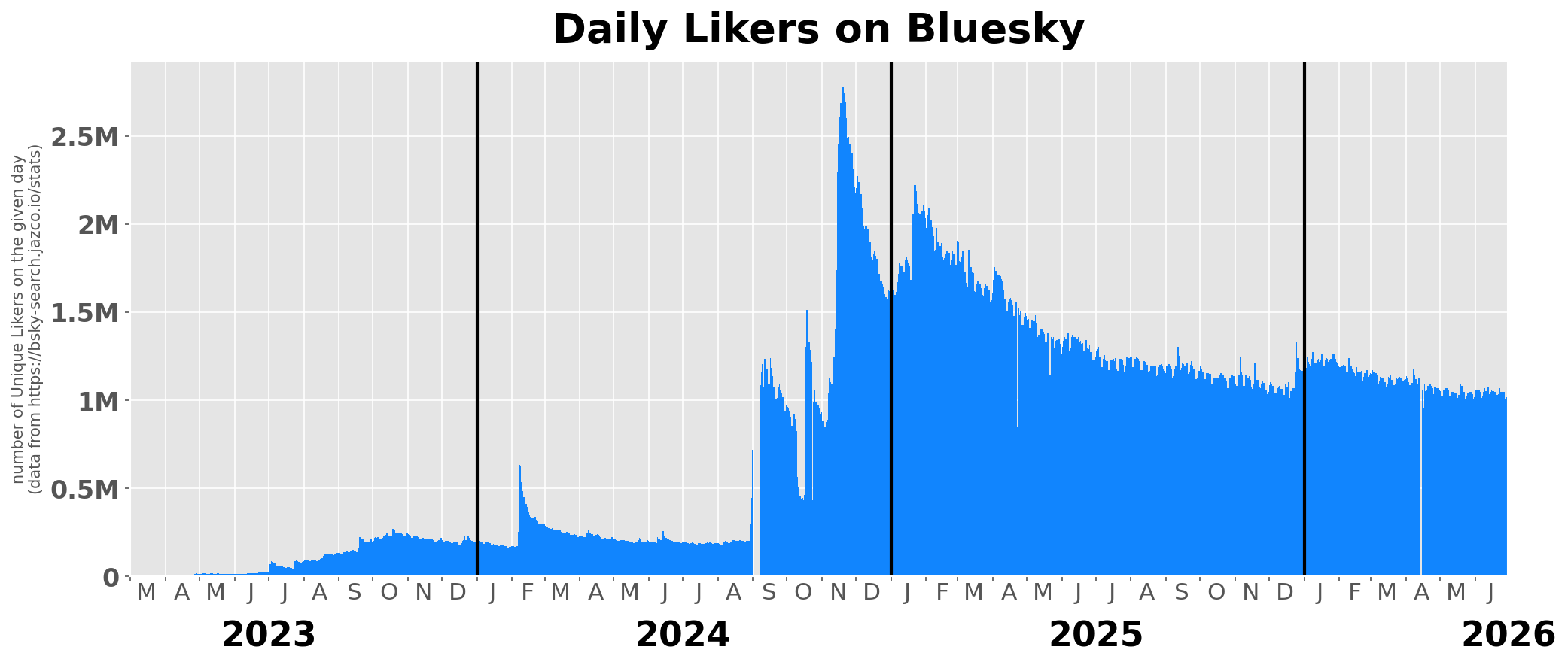
The number of unique likers (users who "Liked" a post) per day on Bluesky over time, showing spikes around the November 2024 US presidential election and the January 2025 inauguration of US president Donald Trump

In the weeks following the 2024 United States presidential election on November 5, 2024, in which Donald Trump was re-elected for a second, non-consecutive term, with Musk being his largest individual donor, millions of X users from the United States, the United Kingdom, and Canada joined Bluesky. By November 13, Bluesky had reached 15 million users, growing by around 1 million users per day and reaching the top of the Apple's App Store and Google's Play Store in the United States.

On November 19, Bluesky officially crossed 20 million users, tripling its userbase within 3 months. This surge also triggered a significant uptick of moderation reports, with Bluesky Safety noting on November 16 that "[i]n the past 24 hours, we have received more than 42,000 reports (an all-time high for one day). We're receiving about 3,000 reports/hour. To put that into context, in all of 2023, we received 360k reports". COO Rose Wang stated that the company's primary focus during the surge was ensuring the platform remained operational while maintaining the integrity of its moderation policies, emphasizing that effective content moderation enhances the user experience.

The major increase in users led to servers being temporarily overloaded, resulting in the platform acquiring more servers. The surge also necessitated a growth in content moderation. While growth was primarily driven by Western European and North American users, popularity of the platform rose in Japan as well.

According to Pew Research Center, the share of news influencers on Bluesky about doubled in the 4 months after 2024 U.S. presidential election, with a lot of new users being left-leaning individuals making Bluesky accounts in light of the controversies surrounding Elon Musk.

By the end of January 2025, the number of registered users had increased to 30 million. During February–March, the number of news influencers on the platform had become double what it was before the election. By April 2025, the site had grown to over 35 million and, as of August 2025, to over 38.5 million registered users.

However, by June 2025, Slate reported that "it appears that more and more of those accounts are becoming ghosts as users abandon the platform. Unique posters and unique likers of posts have been in steady downward descent for months". Around that time, such measures of user activity were down by about half from their peak in November 2024 around the US presidential election. In September 2025, The New Yorker observed that "[a]ccording to Bluesky's open-source data, the number of daily posters on the platform has been declining each month since its peak in January of this year, following Trump's Inauguration (though it is still four times as large as it was last year)."

On April 24, 2025, the site underwent a major outage for an hour.

In the second quarter of 2025, Bluesky's daily user base was one tenth as large as that of X, as estimated by Sensor Tower.

While Bluesky is far smaller than X and Threads, it has become one of the main social networks when it comes to science and journalism.

== Corporate structure ==
Bluesky Social, officially named Bluesky Social PBC, is a privately owned for-profit corporation. The company is headquartered in Seattle, Washington, but considers itself "decentralized" without a physical head office. As of September 2025, it had 29 employees.

Bluesky Social is a benefit corporation; as such, it is allowed to use its profits for the public good, and is not obligated to maximize shareholder value or return profits to its shareholders as dividends. It is owned by former CEO Jay Graber and other Bluesky Social employees. Graber has the largest ownership share of the company. In late 2024, members of the board of directors included Graber, Jeremie Miller, Mike Masnick, and Kinjal Shah.

Funding for operations, as of late 2024, comes primarily from investors and venture capital firms. No advertising is available on the service as of December 2024, and Jay Graber has stated that Bluesky will not "enshittify the network with ads". The company may introduce an optional subscription service for users as well as user-to-user payment services in the future. As of April 2025, the company's only revenue stream was the hosting of accounts on custom domains.

On March 9, 2026, it was announced that Jay Graber had stepped down from her role as CEO, replaced in the interim by venture capitalist Toni Schneider.

== Software and protocol ==
Bluesky unveiled open source code in May 2022 for an early version of its distributed social network protocol, Authenticated Data Experiment (ADX), since renamed the Authenticated Transfer (AT) Protocol. The team opened its early code and placed it under an MIT License so that the development process would be seen in public.

The AT Protocol's initial architecture centers around three main services: a Personal Data Server (PDS), a Relay (previously referred to as a Big Graph Service, or BGS), and an AppView. A PDS is a server which hosts user data in "Data Repositories", which utilize a Merkle tree. The PDS also handles user authentication and manages the signing keys for its hosted repositories. A Relay is described as analogous to an indexer on the web, ingesting repositories from a variety of different PDS hosts and serving them in a single unified stream for other services to ingest. AppViews, meanwhile, are services which consume data from a Relay and can serve it to final users. As of November 2024, most components of the protocol are either only available from Bluesky Social or need to operate with services run by the company to connect to the network, including the main Decentralized Identifier namespace used for almost all accounts that relies on a directory containing all identities and their core information.

While most of the platform's features are available and federated through the AT Protocol, direct messages are offered through a central service outside the AT Protocol that is run by Bluesky Social. The feature is intended to be decentralized with all messages being end-to-end encrypted in the future, with the current iteration intended to be a placeholder for the sake of the user experience.

Posts from the fediverse and most platforms that support it like Mastodon and Threads can be bridged to Bluesky through a tool known as Bridgy Fed. Graber and Mastodon founder Eugen Rochko have discussed collaborating on interoperability, but a journalist from The New Yorker reported in 2025 that "each told me that the other seemed more interested in having the rival platform migrate onto their own protocol."

== Features ==
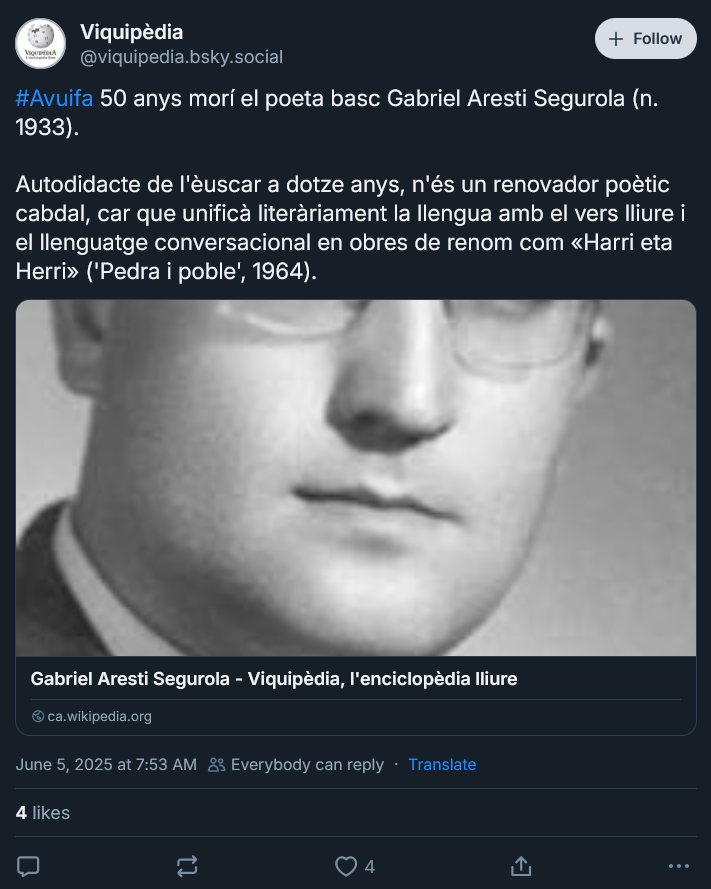
A post by the official account of Catalan Wikipedia

Bluesky is largely analogous to X/Twitter in its structure. Users can send 300-character text messages, images, and video in short posts. Users can reply, repost, quote post and like these posts. Frequent users have called posts on the platform "skeets", a portmanteau of "sky" and "tweets", despite CEO Jay Graber's vigorous disapproval of the term. Bluesky offers a domain name-based handle system via the AT Protocol, allowing users to self-verify an account's legitimacy and identity by proving ownership of a domain name through a DNS text record or HTTPS page in lieu of a "blue check" system that other platforms use. For example, The Washington Post uses their domain "washingtonpost.com" as their handle. The specification does not handle changes in status of the domain names. Unlike Twitter, Bluesky allows users far greater customizability of the experience, enabling users to choose custom algorithmic feeds and moderation services. It also allows the usage of services through custom clients, a practice Twitter offered until January 2023.

Bluesky promotes a "marketplace of algorithms" through its custom feeds feature, where users can choose or create algorithmic feeds of posts related to the feed. Bluesky promotes a list of popular feeds in a dedicated section of their website and app. Bluesky CTO Paul Frazee stated in 2023 that "In future updates [Bluesky] will make it easy for users to create custom feeds in-app." Third-party tools to publish and find custom feeds on Bluesky have been created by independent developers, including websites like Skyfeed and BlueskyFeeds.com. One popular use of custom feeds has been to create a way for users to bookmark posts by replying with a pin emoji (📌), a feature not natively implemented by the platform until 2025. Custom feeds can also be used to filter posts by type, such as posts containing media like photos and videos. Third-party clients offering an interface similar to TikTok and Instagram have been created using these feeds. Starter packs are lists of users who have some relation to a topic, organization, or community that can be created by users to allow others to quickly follow individual users or everybody within the starter pack. The feature was introduced in June 2024. A similar feature (albeit with creation limited to a group of users chosen by the platform) was implemented on Threads.

Moderation in Bluesky is similarly customizable by end users, allowing the creation and usage of custom services with their own policies and labelling mechanisms that differ from Bluesky's official moderation service. Such services can label posts to alert the user, or hide the post entirely. These services can facilitate the creation of novel ways to use Bluesky, such as labelling politicians who have accepted contributions. Users can also create custom moderation lists that allow others to mute or block the accounts contained within the list, although the system can be abused. Bluesky open-sourced its in-house moderation software called "Ozone" in March 2024 for these services.

Direct messaging (DMing) was introduced in May 2024, allowing users to send text messages to each other and to react to them with emojis.

Bluesky introduced "anti-toxicity" features in August 2024, allowing users to "detach" quote posts from their original post and to hide replies to a user's post. Bluesky also promised the addition of a Community Notes-like feature.

In December 2024, Bluesky introduced a "Trending Topics" feature in beta. Similar to X and Threads' trending features, this allows users to see words or phrases that are currently popular. It was updated as part of the new "Explore" feature in April 2025 to have a more prominent design, and the overall feature also shows suggested accounts, starter packs, and trending feeds.

On March 10, 2025, Bluesky added support for 3 minute long videos, and more spam filters for DMs.

On April 21, 2025, Bluesky added a support system for account verification. Bluesky proactively verifies "notable" accounts in a manner similar to Meta or pre-2022 Twitter, but goes further in also enabling selected "Trusted Verifiers" to verify other accounts. Trusted Verifiers have a scalloped blue checkmark next to their name, and verified accounts have a circular blue checkmark. At launch, Bluesky itself, Wired, The New York Times, and The Athletic were among the initial batch of trusted verifiers.

In July 2025, Bluesky launched an opt-in push notifications feature, allowing users to get notified about new posts by particular accounts. The company's announcement featured The Athletic as an example, according to Nieman Lab a reflection of "sports [being] not just a top priority but the top priority" for Bluesky.

In January 2026, Bluesky rolled out a "Live Now" beta feature to all users, that allows users to add a badge for a fixed amount of time on their profile picture to show when a user is live on Twitch.

In February 2026, Bluesky introduced a feature to allow users to save posts as drafts.

In March 2026, Bluesky introduced Attie as a standalone AI assistant built on the AT Protocol that allows users to generate custom feeds with natural language prompts. In October 2026, Bluesky expanded Attie to generate small applications like games and polls.

== Reception ==
Reviewing the app during its invitation-only beta phase in February 2023, TechCrunch called it "a functional, if still rather bare-bones, Twitter-like experience".

Lance Ulanoff of TechRadar originally signed up in April 2023 and at the time declared Bluesky "quiet, reserved, thoughtful, or even polite. Overall, BlueSky is the equivalent of a social media Shangri-La". When he revisited it in November 2024, after the post-U.S.-election surge in signups, he declared that "for the moment, it's the most exciting place on social media" and "I wasted my day on Bluesky Social and no, I'm not sorry".

Another review at TechRadar in November 2024 by Christian Rowlands highlighted key differences between X (Twitter under Musk) and Bluesky, particularly in the level of control provided to users. He noted that Bluesky allows users to choose how their content is filtered and create custom feeds, and also incorporates anti-harassment features like a "traditional block" function and the ability for quote-posts to be "detached" from the original user's thread.

Jason Perlow of ZDNet wrote in November 2024: "It's not a direct replacement for Twitter (X), but Bluesky has a lot to offer those who want a fresh start in a decentralized, privacy-minded network". He highlighted the claimed decentralized nature of Bluesky and the lack of central algorithm, concluding that "Bluesky might be worth your time if you're ready to leave algorithm-driven feeds behind and try a network that prioritizes user control".

Parnell Palme McGuinness, an opinion columnist of the Sydney Morning Herald, was critical of the platform in November 2024, terming it: "a microblogging site for idealists, devoted to protecting them from the raging reality of divergent opinion in a democratic system", a "delicate biosphere of an alternative reality" where "reasonably mainstream opinions attract the ire of the moderators, and are soft-censored as 'intolerance' … not really information so much as a curation of comforting progressive axioms".

Bluesky has been criticized as being a bubble of the American Democratic Party, and an "ideological echo chamber that undermines meaningful dialogue." A May 2025 analysis of news influencers by the Pew Research Center and Knight Foundation found that "Bluesky adoption is concentrated on the left." The study also found that "[f]ew news influencers are on Bluesky but not X; many more are on X but not Bluesky," and that "[n]ews influencers on X tend to be much more active than those on Bluesky. [...] This pattern holds for left-leaning news influencers and those with no clear political orientation."

However, in response to a May 2025 Wired interview question about whether U.S. president Donald Trump would be welcome as a Bluesky user, Graber stressed that "Yeah—Bluesky's for everyone, and we think that over time, the broader public conversation needs to be on an open protocol. That lets people choose their own moderation preferences." On October 17, 2025, several Trump administration agencies began posting on Bluesky, including the Department of Homeland Security which included a video clip of Graber saying "Bluesky's for everyone" in one of its first posts.

A 2025 study in Integrative and Comparative Biology surveyed over 800 scientists and science communicators and found that many now regard Bluesky as a more effective platform than X for professional networking, outreach, and keeping up with research developments. Respondents cited Bluesky's moderation tools, customizable feeds, and reduced algorithmic interference as key advantages.

== Legal and regulatory issues ==
=== Age verification laws ===
==== United Kingdom ====
In July 2025, Bluesky began requiring age verification to comply with the UK's Online Safety Act 2023, using Kids Web Services, a system provided by Epic Games. Users under 18, and those who do not wish to verify their age, are not able to view content that is marked as adult, nor are they allowed to use direct messages.

==== United States ====
On August 22, 2025, Bluesky chose to block access in the state of Mississippi rather than comply with HB 1126, a state law that requires digital services to verify the ages of all users. The social media platform issued a statement: "We think this law creates challenges that go beyond its child safety goals, and creates significant barriers that limit free speech and disproportionately harm smaller platforms and emerging technologies." On December 8, 2025, access to Bluesky was restored to the state, although requiring users to be over 18 to access the site.

On September 10, 2025, in response to laws passed in South Dakota and Wyoming, Bluesky began requiring age verification for adult users in those states who wish to use direct messages or to view content that is marked as adult. As in the UK, the age verification uses Kids Web Services, a system provided by Epic Games. In response to similar laws, age verification was implemented in Ohio on September 29, 2025, while users under 18 in Tennessee and under 16 in Virginia were blocked from using the website on December 16, 2025, and January 1, 2026, respectively.

==== Australia ====
On December 8, 2025, Bluesky began requiring age verification to all users within Australia, in order to comply with the Online Safety Amendment. This requires users to verify their identities, by using Kids Web Services, in order to access direct messages and view adult content.

=== Blocking in Turkey ===
In early April 2025, Turkish courts ordered 44 Bluesky accounts to be blocked. In mid-April, 18 accounts and 2 posts were hidden by Bluesky from people accessing them from Turkey. The Stockholm Center for Freedom estimated the number of blocked accounts to be 72. The moderation is applied using Bluesky's labeler system, which automatically implements on the service's first-party clients both its global and region-specific moderation labelers. Third-party clients that have not implemented support for the region-based moderation allow people in Turkey (and any other country with such labelers) to ignore the additional labelers, bypassing the blocks.

== See also ==
- Comparison of microblogging and similar services
- Comparison of software and protocols for distributed social networking
- List of most-followed Bluesky accounts
