= Peer-to-peer web hosting =

Decentralized website hosting using peer networks

Peer-to-peer web hosting involves using peer-to-peer networking to distribute access to webpages. This is differentiated from the client–server model, which involves the distribution of web data between dedicated web servers and user-end client computers. Peer-to-peer web hosting may also take the form of P2P web caches and content delivery networks.

== Comparison ==
Peer-to-peer web hosting does not differentiate between clients and servers, all nodes can request and respond to services. All Nodes can store data, they can both create and consume resources, meaning that a hosting's capacity to share resources will increase alongside the number of nodes present. Its often less costly than client-server web hosting. Peer-to-peer sharing is meant to help save bandwidth when sharing large files between two machines, as it is incredibly efficient at sharing data. This method can be risky due the lack of security, many files found and shared on peer-to-peer sites can be illegal or dangerous to your operating machine.

Client-server web hosting does differentiate between clients and servers, a central server is used to store data and respond to the services requested by a client. Client-server networks are more stable though they do start to fall off as client numbers increase. It's much easier to regulate data as all data is stored within the central web server and is accessible to the host.

Name	First release date	Anonymous	Fast	Per file edit rights	Per file read rights (P2P)	Offline compatible (Note: Can the hosted web site be used (browsed) by the users even if the owner has shut down their node (the computer that hosted it first).)	FOSS implementation	Notes
Freenet	2000	Yes	No	No	No	Yes	Yes	
Osiris	2010	Yes	Yes	No	No	Yes	No	
Hivenet								
IPFS	2014	No	Yes	No	No	Yes	Yes	
Maelstrom	2014	No	Yes	?	?	?	No	Project seems suspended since 2015
ZeroNet	2015	No	Yes	Yes	No	Yes	Yes	DHT
Dat	2013	No	Yes	?	?	Yes	Yes	Sites can be viewed in Beaker Browser, or in Firefox using an experimental add-on.
Blockstack	2015	Yes	Yes	?	?	Yes	Yes	Uses the Stacks blockchain v1.

== See also ==
- WebRTC - a web standard for peer-to-peer communication between web browsers
- Freesite – a site on Freenet
- Cloud computing
- Decentralized computing
