= Decentralized web =

Proposed internet architecture changes

The decentralized web is a network of independent computers that provide secure, censorship-resistant access to information and services without relying on central servers or clouds, using decentralized computing.

== History and development ==
Decentralized computing has a long theoretical and practical history in the design of robust systems. The internet itself was designed around principles of decentralization, allowing an unknown network of machines to be organically connected, addressed, and updated over time without a central administration.

In the development of the internet, Web 1.0 is sometimes described as primarily static webpages with minimal interactivity; while Web 2.0 was described as the "read/write" web, with dynamic content and user interaction, including platforms like YouTube and the advent of smartphones which could easily capture and broadcast information from anywhere. The rise of cloud computing and large platforms that served the needs of Web 2.0 led to a recentralization of the internet around those services.

Web3, also called Web 3.0, is the name given to a decentralized web movement that is sometimes described as a "read/write/own" stage of internet development. It focuses on decentralizing the underlying infrastructure of the internet, shifting away from centralized data storage and management using new protocols and technologies. Motivation for this includes:

- Decentralization and democracy: A key aspect of Web 3.0 is its aim to restore the decentralized nature of the original web, thereby returning control and ownership to users. This shift is seen as a way to counteract the loss of democracy and freedom caused by centralized control of data.
- Censorship and security: Web 3.0 addresses major Internet issues like censorship by governments and security risks due to centralized data storage. Decentralization in Web 3.0 could significantly reduce these issues.
- Challenges of bandwidth and storage: Web 3.0 also aims to tackle the inefficiencies of bandwidth usage and storage limitations inherent in Web 2.0, proposing solutions like the InterPlanetary File System (IPFS) for more efficient data handlings.

== Decentralized protocols ==
Like the centralized data storage of the centralized web, decentralized web protocols provide a shared data layer, eliminating the need for centralized data centers. This means data is stored on users' computers and used across various decentralized applications.

BitTorrent and other peer-to-peer filesharing networks are one of the earliest successful decentralized protocols, allowing for file sharing and storage without a central archive, and allowing large files to be shared by many participants who could not store it in its entirety. Blockchain networks are a more recent example of decentralized tools and systems, in particular built on low-trust networks and transactions.

In 2021, BitTorrent announced the development of Project Maelstrom to develop a fully decentralized and censorship-resistant browser. Other decentralized browsers such as Beaker have been developed building on top of IPFS and other file-storage protocols.

== In popular culture ==
Starting in 2016, the Internet Archive and Protocol Labs began hosting a regular DWeb Summit dedicated to new technical and social communities building the decentralized web.

A decentralized internet became the main focus of the American comedy television series created by Mike Judge, Silicon Valley. After focusing much of the first seasons on a new data compression algorithm, beginning with Silicon Valley season 4 the focus shifted to the idea and implementation of a decentralized internet.

== See also ==
- AT Protocol
- ActivityPub
- Fediverse
- History of the World Wide Web
