= Well-known URI =

Uniform address for services on a website

A well-known URI is a Uniform Resource Identifier for URL path prefixes that start with /.well-known/. They are implemented in webservers so that requests to the servers for well-known services or information are available at URL consistent well-known locations across servers.

== Description ==
Well-known URIs are Uniform Resource Identifiers defined by the IETF in RFC 8615. They are URL path prefixes that start with /.well-known/. This implementation is in response to the common expectation for web-based protocols to require certain services or information be available at URLs consistent across servers, regardless of the way URL paths are organized on a particular host. The URIs are implemented in webservers so that requests to the servers for well-known services or information are available at URLs consistently in well-known locations across servers.

The IETF has defined a simple way for web servers to hold metadata that any user agent (e.g., web browser) can request. The metadata is useful for various tasks, including directing a web user to use a mobile app instead of the website or indicating the different ways that the site can be secured. The well-known locations are used by web servers to share metadata with user agents; sometimes these are files and sometimes these are requests for information from the web server software itself. The way to declare the different metadata requests that can be provided is standardized by the IETF so that other developers know how to find and use this information.

=== Use ===
The path well-known URI begins with the characters /.well-known/, and whose scheme is "HTTP", "HTTPS", or another scheme that has explicitly been specified to use well-known URIs. As an example, if an application hosts the service "example", the corresponding well-known URIs on https://www.example.com/ would start with https://www.example.com/.well-known/example.

Information shared by a web site as a well-known service is expected to meet a specific standard. Specifications that need to define a resource for such site-wide metadata can register their use with the Internet Assigned Numbers Authority (IANA) to avoid collisions and minimize impingement upon sites' URI space.

== List of well-known URIs ==
The list below describes known standards for .well-known services that a web server can implement.

URI suffix	Description	Reference	Date of IANA registration
acme-challenge	Automated Certificate Management Environment (ACME)		2019-03-01
agent-card.json	Details for an A2A Server's Agent Card		
ai-catalog.json	Agentic Resource Discovery Specification		
ai-plugin.json	Manifest for a ChatGPT plugin		
apple-app-site-association	An Apple service that enables secure data exchange between iOS and a website		
apple-developer-merchantid-domain-association	Apple Pay		
appspecific	Used by some application to get some informations about the application (e.g. chrome devtools: appspecific/com.chrome.devtools.json)		
ashrae	BACnet – A data communication protocol for building automation and control networks		2016-01-22
assetlinks.json	AssetLinks protocol used to identify one or more digital assets (such as web sites or mobile apps) that are related to the hosting web site in some fashion		2015-09-28
atproto-did	Handle-to-DID resolution for AT Protocol		
autoconfig/mail	Mozilla Thunderbird mail autoconfiguration service		
browserid	Mozilla Persona		
caldav	Calendaring Extensions to WebDAV (CalDAV) and vCard Extensions to WebDAV (CardDAV)		
carddav	Calendaring Extensions to WebDAV (CalDAV) and vCard Extensions to WebDAV (CardDAV)		
change-password	Helps password managers find the URL for changing client account passwords		
coap	CoAP (Constrained Application Protocol) over TCP, TLS, and WebSockets		2017-12-22
com.apple.remotemanagement	Apple-Account–based user enrollment for mobile device management		
com.chrome.devtools.json	Automatic Workspace Folders - Chromium DevTools Ecosystem Guide for Web development tools		
core	Constrained RESTful Environments (CoRE) Link Format		
csvm	CSV metadata, Model for Tabular Data and Metadata on the Web		2015-09-28
dat	Links domain to Dat identifier, used by Beaker web browser		
did.json	did:web Decentralized Identifiers (DIDs) for the Web		
discord	Domain verification for Discord account connection		
dnt	Site-wide tracking status resource		2015-08-19
dnt-policy.txt	A privacy-friendly Do Not Track (DNT) Policy		2015-08-19
est	Enrollment over Secure Transport (EST)		2013-08-16
genid	Resource Description Framework (RDF) Skolem IRIs		2012-11-15
gpc.json	Global Privacy Control (GPC)		
hoba	HTTP Origin-Bound Authentication (HOBA)		2015-01-20
host-meta	Web Host Metadata		
host-meta.json	Web Host Metadata		
http-opportunistic	Opportunistic Security for HTTP/2		2017-03-20
keybase.txt	Used by the Keybase project to identify a proof that one or more people whose public keys may be retrieved using the Keybase service have administrative control over the origin server from which it is retrieved		2014-04-08
keyparc	Used by the Bloombase Keyparc project to secure online digital assets using cryptography over web services		2012-09-23
matrix	Provides discovery for both client and server APIs to the Matrix federated protocol		
mercure	Discovery of Mercure hubs. Mercure is a protocol enabling the pushing of data updates to web browsers and other HTTP clients in a fast, reliable and battery-efficient way.		
mta-sts.txt	SMTP MTA Strict Transport Security Policy		2018-06-21
ni	Naming Things with Hashes		
nodeinfo	Metadata for federated social networking servers		
nostr.json	Discovery of Nostr public keys and related relays, according to NIP-05		2024-03-18
oauth-authorization-server	OAuth Authorization Server Metadata		2018-03-27
openid-configuration	OpenID Connect		2013-08-27
openorg	Organisation Profile Document		2015-05-29
openpgpkey	OpenPGP Web Key Service		
org.flathub.VerifiedApps.txt	Verifies that an app is associated with given domain in Flathub		
passkey-endpoints	Formally advertises support for passkeys and provides direct links for enrollment and management for password managers to automatically create/upgrade.		
pki-validation	CA/Browser Forum's Baseline Requirements Certificate Policy for the Issuance and Management of Publicly-Trusted Certificates		2017-02-06
posh	PKIX over Secure HTTP (POSH)		2015-09-20
privacy-sandbox-attestations.json	The Google Chrome Privacy Sandbox attestation file		
pubvendors.json	The IAB pubvendors.json tech spec, which provide a standard for publishers to publicly declare the vendors that they work with, and their respective data rights/configuration		2020-09-07
reload-config	REsource LOcation And Discovery (RELOAD) Base Protocol		
repute-template	A Reputation Query Protocol		2013-09-30
resourcesync	ResourceSync Framework Specification		2017-05-26
security.txt	Standard to help organizations define the process for security researchers to disclose security vulnerabilities		2018-08-20
smart-configuration	SMART on FHIR configuration metadata, including OAuth authorization_endpoint and token_endpoint URLs		2023-03-01
statements.txt	Standard for collective contract signing		
stun-key	Session Traversal Utilities for NAT (STUN) Extension for Third-Party Authorization		2015-06-12
tdmrep.json	Domain-wide TDM (Text and Data Mining) reservation		
time	Time over HTTPS specification		2015-12-09
timezone	Time Zone Data Distribution Service		2015-08-03
traffic-advice	Prefetch control (proposal; implemented in Chrome Privacy Preserving Prefetch Proxy crawler)		
ucp	Business profile declaring supported capabilities for the Universal Commerce Protocol (UCP)		
uma2-configuration	User-Managed Access (UMA) 2.0 grant for OAuth 2.0 authorization		2017-06-20
vercel/flags	Overridable Feature Flag's for Vercel's Toolbar		
void	Describing Linked Datasets with the VoID Vocabulary		2011-05-11
wasm-pkg/registry.json	WebAssembly registry		
webauthn	WebAuthn Related Origins		
webfinger	WebFinger		2013-03-15, 2013-09-06
workflow	Workflow Development Kit Routes		
xrp-ledger.toml	XRP ledger node & account information		
