= Space monkey =

Space monkey(s) may refer to:

- Monkeys in space, monkeys launched into space

In music:

- Space Monkey (band), a 1980s British pop group
- Space Monkeys, a 1990s band from Manchester, England
- Spacemonkeyz, a group that remixed the Gorillaz album in 2002
- "Space Monkey", a song by John Prine from Live on Tour
- "Space Monkey", a song by Patti Smith Group from Easter
- "Space Monkey", a song by Placebo from Meds
- captain Simian & the Space Monkeys, an American animated television series
- Space Monkey (company), a decentralized cloud company

In other uses:

- A recurring element of the one million masterpiece collaborative art project
- A member of Project Mayhem in the novel Fight Club
- The working codename for Adobe Photoshop CS2
- The artist Dalek's most recognisable work
