= Alliance for Audited Media =

Nonprofit organization

- Founded: 1914
- Founder: Association of National Advertisers
- Headquarters: Illinois
- Revenue: 13,847,785 United States dollar (2023)
- Total assets: 16,647,562 United States dollar (2022)
- Website: auditedmedia.com

The Alliance for Audited Media (AAM) is a North American not-for-profit industry organization founded in 1914 by the Association of National Advertisers to help ensure media transparency and trust among advertisers and media companies. Originally known as the Audit Bureau of Circulations (ABC), today AAM is a source of verified media information and technology platform certifications, providing standards, audit services and data for the advertising and publishing industries.

In early 2023, AAM merged with BPA Worldwide to create the largest not-for-profit media auditing organization dedicated to increasing trust, transparency and assurance across the media industry.

It is one of nearly two dozen such organizations operating worldwide, affiliated with the International Federation of Audit Bureaux of Circulations (IFABC).

== History ==
At the turn of the 20th century, the Association of National Advertisers (ANA) observed a market need for verifiable, authenticated circulation figures from print publishers. As a result, in 1914, advertisers, ad agencies and publishers in the U.S. and Canada united to form the first Audit Bureau of Circulations to bring trust and accountability to the print media market.

On November 15, 2012, ABC in North America rebranded its organization as the Alliance for Audited Media to reflect a broader new media environment as well as a simpler and less confusing name.

In 2022, the organization started participating in trust.txt by the group JournalList to help identify publishers who are more trustworthy based on their associations and memberships.

In March 2023, the Alliance for Audited Media and BPA Worldwide completed a merger to become the largest not-for-profit media auditing organization.

== Governance ==
AAM is governed by a tripartite board of directors composed of leaders in publishing, marketing and advertising. Together with a network of committees, the AAM board sets the standards by which print and digital media are measured and reported. AAM audited data is relied upon by marketers and ad agencies to plan for and buy media. This information is housed in an AAM database, disseminated via several complementary industry data providers (such as Gfk MRI and Kantar Media SRDS) and fed directly to proprietary databases of many large ad agencies and client-side marketers.

The organization is headquartered in Schaumburg, Illinois.

== Membership ==
Membership is open to all publishers, digital media companies, advertisers and advertising agencies. Additionally, any individual, firm or corporation that requires access to media data may apply for an associate membership. AAM serves as an industry forum, connecting advertisers, ad agencies and publishers to discuss issues and trends and set standards.

== See also ==
- Audit Bureau of Circulations
- Newspaper circulation
- International Federation of Audit Bureaux of Circulations (ABC)
