= PAST storage utility =

PAST is a large-scale, distributed, persistent storage system based on the Pastry peer-to-peer overlay network.

== See also ==
- Pastry (DHT) (PAST section)
