= Semantic P2P networks =

Semantic P2P networks are a new type of P2P network. It combines the advantages of unstructured P2P networks and structural P2P networks, and avoids their disadvantages.

In Semantic P2P networks, nodes are classified as DNS-like domain names with semantic meanings such as Alice @Brittney.popular.music. Semantic P2P networks contains prerequisite virtual tree topology and net-like topology formed by cached nodes. Semantic P2P networks keep the semantic meanings of nodes and their contents. The nodes within semantic P2P networks can communicate each other by various languages. Semantic P2P network can execute complicated queries by SQL-like language.

There are similarities between semantic P2P systems and software agents. P2P means that entities exchange information directly without a mediator. Semantic is a concept to add meaning to information. Peer are usually autonomous systems as well as agents. Agents follow a goal, though. Such goal attainment requires a knowledge base and rules and strategies. That's the major difference between software agents and semantic peers. The latter lacks that kind of intelligence.

== See also ==
- Semantic desktop
- Semantic network
- Semantic Web
