= Block Buzz =

Multi-user LLM agent harness developed by Block

Buzz
- Developer: Block, Inc.
- Written in: Rust
- Operating system: macOS, Linux, Windows
- Type: LLM agent harness Collaborative software
- License: Apache License 2.0
- Repository: github.com/block/buzz

Buzz is an open-source multi-user harness for large language model agents and a workplace collaboration application developed by Block, Inc. It was announced by Block co-founder Jack Dorsey on July 21, 2026.

Buzz allows multiple human users and AI agents to participate in shared channels, with each user or agent assigned a separate cryptographic identity. It combines group messaging with agent orchestration, software repositories and automated workflows.

The software uses a self-hostable Nostr relay, on which messages, reactions, workflow actions and Git events are recorded as signed events. Its agent harness supports external coding agents through the Agent Client Protocol. As of late July, the repository grew to 2,000+ commits, 100+ contributors, 22,000+ followers (stars), and 2,500+ forks.
