= Security.txt =

Internet standard for posting security contact information

security.txt
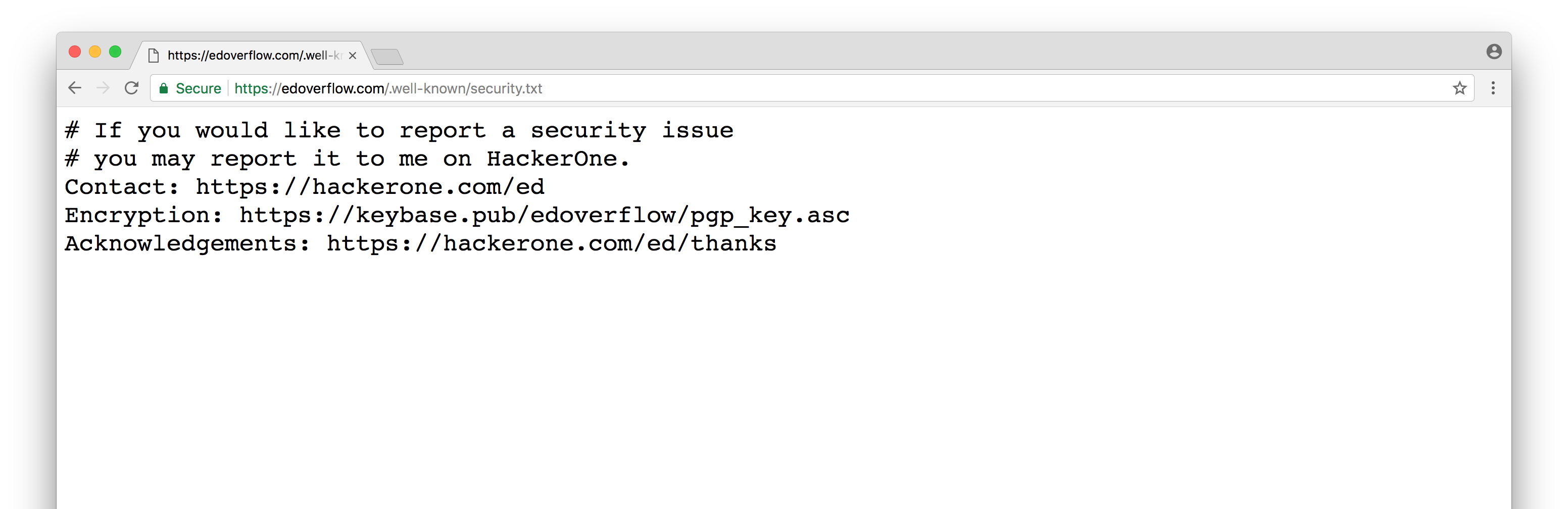
- Example security.txt file
- Status: Published
- Year started: 2017
- First published: September 2017
- Latest version: April 2022
- Authors: Edwin Foudil
- Base standards: RFC 9116
- Website: securitytxt.org

security.txt is an accepted standard for website security information that allows security researchers to report security vulnerabilities easily. The standard prescribes a text file named security.txt in the well known location, similar in syntax to robots.txt but intended to be machine and human readable, for those wishing to contact a website's owner about security issues.

== History ==
The Internet Draft was first submitted by Edwin Foudil in September 2017. At that time it covered four directives, "Contact", "Encryption", "Disclosure" and "Acknowledgement". Foudil expected to add further directives based on feedback. In addition, web security expert Scott Helme said he had seen positive feedback from the security community while use among the top 1 million websites was "as low as expected right now".

In 2019, the Cybersecurity and Infrastructure Security Agency (CISA) published a draft binding operational directive that requires all US federal agencies to publish a security.txt file within 180 days. As of November 2019, security.txt files had already been widely adopted, including by Google, GitHub, LinkedIn, and Facebook.

The Internet Engineering Steering Group (IESG) issued a Last Call for security.txt in December 2019 which ended on January 6, 2020.

A study in 2021 found that over ten percent of top-100 websites published a security.txt file, with the percentage of sites publishing the file decreasing as more websites were considered. The study also noted a number of discrepancies between the standard and the content of the file.

In April 2022, the security.txt file has been accepted by Internet Engineering Task Force (IETF) as RFC 9116.

== File format ==
security.txt files can be served under the /.well-known/ directory (i.e. /.well-known/security.txt) or the top-level directory (i.e. /security.txt) of a website. The file must be served over HTTPS and in plaintext format.

== See also ==
- ads.txt
- humans.txt
- robots.txt
- trust.txt
