= Ads.txt =

Text file format used in online advertising management

ads.txt (Authorized Digital Sellers) is an initiative from IAB Technology Laboratory. It specifies a text file that companies can host on their web servers, listing the other companies authorized to sell their products or services. This is designed to allow online ad space buyers to check the validity of the sellers from whom they buy ad space, for the purposes of internet fraud prevention, in particular, ad fraud.

== State of adoption ==
By November 2017, more than 44% of publishers had ads.txt files. More than 90,000 sites were using ads.txt, up from 3,500 in September 2017, according to Pixalate. Among the top 1,000 sites that sold programmatic ads, 57 percent had ads.txt files, compared to 16 percent in September, per Pixalate. Adoption peaked in November 2024 and began declining.

Adoption data per FirstImpression.io's Ads.txt Industry Dashboard:

Websites Tier	Jan 30th, 2026	Jan 30th, 2020	Jan 30th, 2019	Jan 30th, 2018
Alexa Top 1,000	42.4%	44.20%	40.90%	33.70%
Alexa Top 5,000	38.1%	39.58%	36.00%	29.06%
Alexa Top 10,000	34.9%	36.66%	32.75%	25.18%
Alexa Top 30,000	29.2%	31.71%	26.34%	18.52%

Google has been an active proponent of ads.txt. From the end of October 2017 Google Display & Video 360 only buys inventory from sources identified as authorized sellers in a publisher's ads.txt file, when a file is available. ads.txt may become a requirement for Display & Video 360.

== File format ==
The IAB's ads.txt specification dictates the formatting of ads.txt files, which can contain three types of record; data records, variables and comments. An ads.txt file can include any number of records, each placed on their own line.

Since the ads.txt file format must be adhered to, a range of validation, management and collaboration tools have become available to help ensure ads.txt files are created correctly.

A standard data record consists of three required fields and one optional field separated by commas. These fields identify the authorized advertising system, the publisher's account identifier within that system, the relationship type (either DIRECT or RESELLER), and an optional certification authority identifier.

The original specification, v1.0, was issued in 2017. with version 1.0.1 making small changes based on community feedback later that year. In 2019, version 1.0.2 made further small amendments and recommended using a placeholder record to indicate the intent of an empty ads.txt file. placeholder.example.com, placeholder, DIRECT, placeholder

In 2021, version 1.0.3 added the inventorypartnerdomain directive, with version 1.1 adding managerdomain and ownerdomain in 2022.

== See also ==
- Online advertising
- robots.txt
- security.txt
- trust.txt
