= Nostr =

Decentralized social networking protocol

Notes and Other Stuff Transmitted by Relays
- Communication protocol
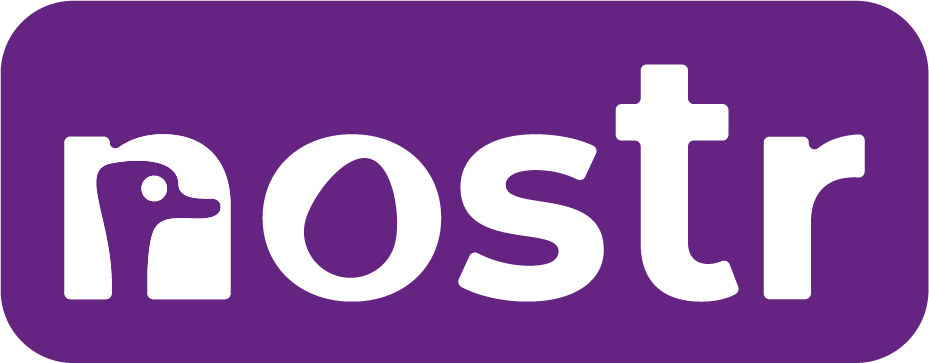
- Abbreviation: Nostr
- Purpose: Decentralized social networking
- Developer: fiatjaf
- Introduction: March 2020; 6 years ago
- Ports: 80, 443
- Website: github.com/nostr

Nostr (acronym for Notes and Other Stuff Transmitted by Relays) is a decentralized communication open protocol which was built to resist internet censorship.

Nostr can be used for social media and other applications.

== Development ==
The Nostr protocol was first written in 2020 by a Brazilian open source developer known by the pseudonym "fiatjaf" as a response to perceived moderation issues on Twitter, as well as both technical and cultural disagreements with other protocols such as ActivityPub and Secure Scuttlebutt. In 2024, in an article reporting on the project's funding, Business Insider claimed to have identified fiatjaf, and had found two websites previously published by this person to disseminate the work of Olavo de Carvalho, a far-right conspiracy theorist.

Nostr is an open standard, and the majority of third-party apps that use Nostr are free and open-source. Data on the Nostr protocol is stored in JSON blobs called Events, which are the only kind of object on the Nostr protocol. Users are identified by their public key, tagged as an "npub" key. Different extensions to the Nostr protocol are called Nostr Implementation Possibilities, or "NIPs". One of these extensions provides integration with the Lightning Network, a separate payment protocol that operates over the Bitcoin network, allowing the sending and requesting of small payments (nicknamed "Zaps") among Nostr users. Other NIPs include ways to add a human-readable alias to an npub key using a well-known URI hosted on a web server, a method that is used by other protocols such ActivityPub and the AT Protocol.

As a result of its ability to quickly and discreetly create accounts and publish posts to relays, Nostr can propagate spam much more easily if left unchecked. A notable example includes a case where multiple protocol bridges have been used to conduct spam waves on the Bluesky social network (itself connected to a competing protocol, the AT Protocol) by creating posts on Nostr, bridging the posts to ActivityPub and bridging it again to Bluesky.

Nostr has also been used to develop apps other than social media apps. For example, Shakespeare, an open-source AI site builder operates using Nostr as the base protocol. Additionally, White Noise is a private messenger app that runs over Nostr.

In July 2026, Block announced Buzz, an open-source collaboration platform for humans and AI agents built on Nostr.

== Users ==
The Nostr client Damus is a microblogging social networking app akin to Twitter. Damus was the first Nostr app to be listed on the App Store. Two days after it was launched in February 2023, Damus was removed from the Chinese version of the App Store per a directive from the Cyberspace Administration of China. Reason reported in August 2025 that some Chinese NOSTR users were bypassing the Great Firewall of China via VPNs.

Other NOSTR social media clients include Primal on iOS, Amethyst on Android, or Coracle for a web client.

In June 2026, the passkey manager Fenko Vault was launched, featuring cross-device synchronization facilitated by Nostr relays.

Notable supporters of Nostr include NSA whistleblower Edward Snowden, and Jack Dorsey, the co-founder of Twitter. It has been popular with bitcoin and cryptocurrency users, in part, due to a Nostr protocol extension called "Lightning Zap" which allows users to send bitcoin lightning micropayments to posts. Dorsey donated approximately $250,000 worth of Bitcoin to the developers of the project in 2023, as well as a $10 million cash donation to a Nostr development collective in 2025.

As of May 2023, the protocol had over 18 million users across its network.

== See also ==
- ActivityPub, a decentralized social networking protocol
- AT Protocol, a similar protocol used by Bluesky
- Secure Scuttlebutt – Decentralized social network
