= Tradepal =

American education technology company

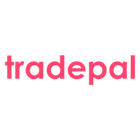
- Company type: Private
- Founded: 2009
- Headquarters: 535 Mission Street, San Francisco, CA 94105, USA
- Founders: Karim Guessous (Co-founder, CEO) Tamar Burton (Co-founder, CXO)
- Industry: Virtual learning environment

Tradepal (est. in 2009) is an education technology company based in San Francisco, California. The Company designs online tutoring software for collaborative learning to increase student success and retention in schools and colleges.

== History ==
During their early initiatives, the Company developed technologies to facilitate the building of a proprietary interest graph leading to the discovery, sharing, and trading of items among like-minded people. The company developed a mobile application to provide students with a platform to support fellow students struggling with food and housing insecurity along with a growing number of campus initiatives including Keep America Beautiful with RecycleMania, Campus-based Food Pantries, and the Food Recovery Network (FRN).

Tradepal introduced its people-centric marketplace at the DEMO conference held in Santa Clara, California on September 12 to 14, 2011. The peer-to-peer (P2P) product was well received by the Silicon Valley technical community, and was named one of the top 10 favorite startups at the DEMO Conference. As of April 2013 Tradepal.com offered P2P sharing of resources to college communities.

Tradepal originally designed a P2P platform where counterparts would buy, sell and trade and ultimately take steps to reduce their carbon footprint by promoting sustainable behaviors through reuse. In 2014, the Company created a mobile-first application to engage students promoting sustainability on college campuses. The Company collaborated with student organizations located in California, Florida, and Texas who were part of the American College & University Presidents' Climate Commitment (ACUPCC) network of colleges and universities. In 2018, the Company transitioned into a business-to-business (B2B) service where it develops educational, training and collaborative learning software platforms.

== Original operations ==
Tradepal was made up of a core principle and multiple functionalities. Central to the experience on Tradepal is the social and interest graphs of the user, commonly called the Cluster of Friends, which includes both Facebook friends on Tradepal and Tradepal friends. The functionalities evolve around a User Profile that comprises the user’s Items, the Friends’ and Friends of Friends’ listings, the user’s Wishes and individual Carbon Savings Calculator. Both Profiles and Listed Items could be shared internally with Tradepal friends, or externally with Facebook friends and Twitter followers. Users can trade with peers by instantly buying an item using the Buy Now option or by sending an offer using either cash and/or barter Users can also communicate with one another using messaging, item comments, or online chat. The concept of trust is based on both the use of Facebook identities as Tradepal identities as well as a rating system derived from all transactions conducted on the platform. All payments are conducted through PayPal's Adaptive Payments and benefit from PayPal’s Buyer’s Protection.

== See also ==
- eLearning
- Workforce development
- Learning Management System
- Knowledge Management
- Collaborative learning
