= Trust.txt =

Filename for news organizations

trust.txt is designed to help distinguish legitimate news sources from pink-slime journalism. Its first method was by sending a signal to search engines as to which trusted networks the organization is a part of. The open-source project is run by JournalList.net. It was launched in 2018. It draws inspiration from robots.txt and ads.txt which also send signals to search engines and other bots on the web. A browser extension was published by 2025 to allow consumers to easily view the signals as well. There were 3000 publishers who participated as of 2024. Some of the publishers include the Florida Press Association and the Associated Press.

== See also ==
- Journalism Trust Initiative
- security.txt
