= Protocol Labs =

Software company

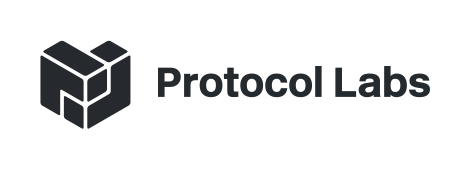
- Company type: Privately held company
- Industry: Computer Industry
- Founded: May 2014
- Founder: Juan Benet
- Key people: Juan Benet, Marvin Ammori
- Products: InterPlanetary File System, Filecoin
- ASN: 40680
- Website: protocol.ai

Protocol Labs is an open-source software research and development company, founded in 2014. It is best known for creating the InterPlanetary File System (IPFS), a peer-to-peer decentralized web protocol, and Filecoin, a decentralized file storage network.

== History ==
Juan Benet founded Protocol Labs in May 2014. Early work on open-source tools to simplify management, indexing, and conversion of large data sets led to the creation of the InterPlanetary File System (IPFS), a peer-to-peer protocol for distributed files and offline applications. To support the project and spur adoption, they developed a Filecoin protocol and token for decentralized file storage, to let users rent out unused disk space.

== Projects ==
IPFS was released in January 2015, and Filecoin launched in 2017. Other projects developed by Protocol Labs include libp2p, a network stack for peer-to-peer apps and systems, which is used as the networking layer for IPFS; IPLD, a data model for interoperable protocols.

== See also ==
- InterPlanetary File System
- Filecoin
