= Beaker (web browser) =

Web browser software

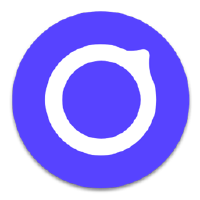

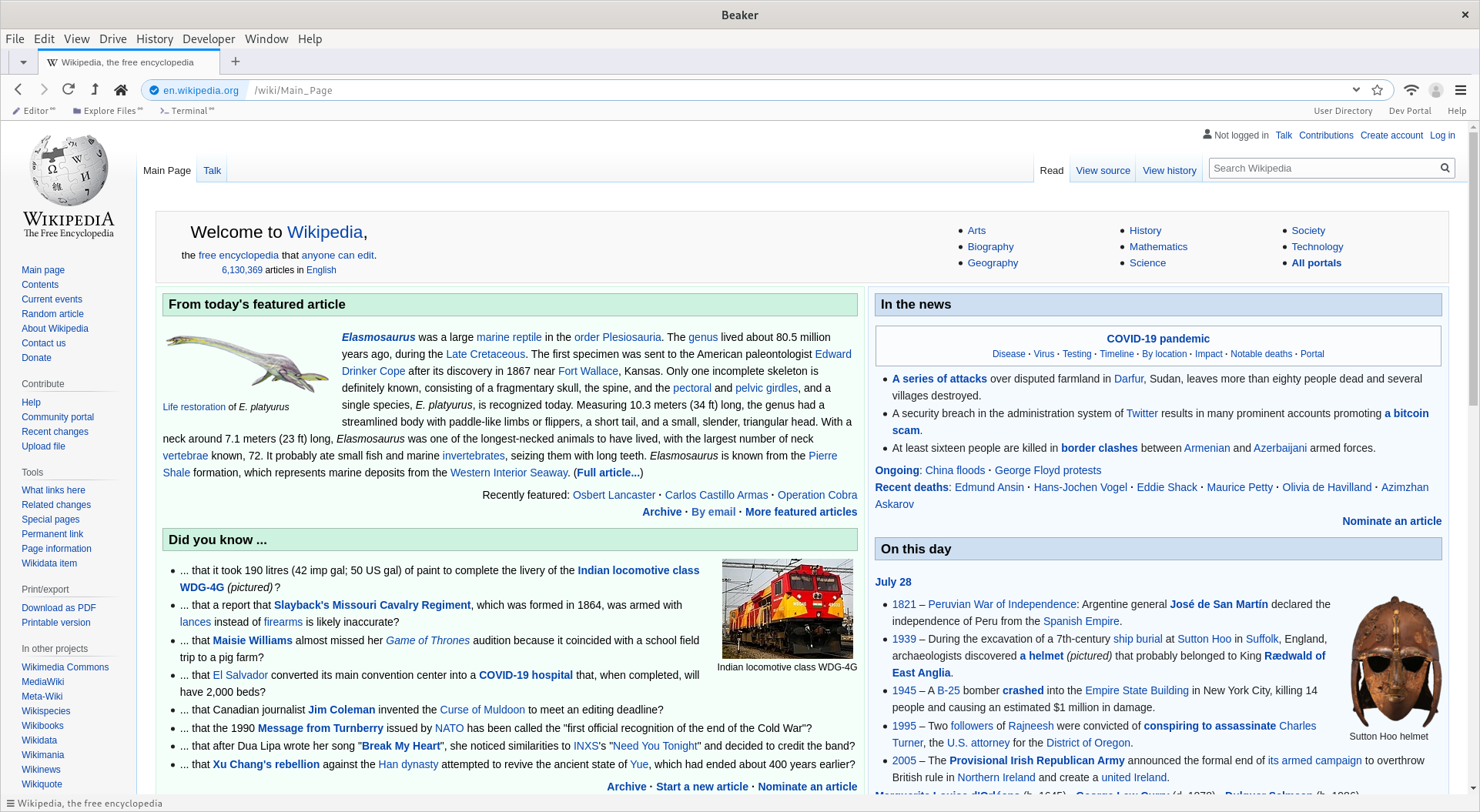
- Screenshot of the Beaker browser on Fedora 31
- Developer: Blue Link Labs.
- Initial release: 1 August 2017; 8 years ago

Stable release(s)
- 1.1.0 (December 8, 2020; 5 years ago) [±]

Preview release(s)
- 1.0.0 Pre-release 4 (June 4, 2020; 5 years ago) [±]
- Operating system: Linux, Microsoft Windows, macOS
- Platform: x86-64
- Type: Open-source web browser
- License: MIT License
- Website: web.archive.org/web/20250201002303/https://beakerbrowser.com/ (Wayback Machine archive for https://beakerbrowser.com)
- Repository: github.com/beakerbrowser/beaker

Beaker is a discontinued free and open-source web browser developed by Blue Link Labs. Beaker Browser peer-to-peer technology allows users to self-publish websites and web apps directly from the browser, without the need to set up and administrate a separate web server or host their content on a third-party server. All files and websites are transferred using Dat, a hypermedia peer-to-peer protocol, which allows files to be shared and hosted by several users. The browser also supports the HTTP protocol to connect to traditional servers.

Beaker is built using the Electron framework and therefore uses the Chromium browser as a renderer for webpages.

== Content sharing ==
Files stored in a local folder can be published as a Dat website and made accessible to other users through the peer-to-peer protocol.

The files are seeded from the local folder while the browser is active. To make them also available while the browser is closed, the user may use several alternative options to host the content:

- Ask other users of the browser to share a copy. The content will be accessible as long as any of the users are using the Beaker browser.
- Publish the content through a third-party server.
- Create a permanent self-hosted homebase server for the Dat protocol, and publish the content in it.

== See also ==
- Dat (software)
- Comparison of web browsers
- Peer-to-peer web hosting
- Distributed computing
