= Space Monkey (company) =

American cloud storage company

- Industry: Cloud computing; Web hosting; Data storage device
- Founded: 2011
- Founders: Clint Gordon-Carroll, Alen Peacock
- Headquarters: Midvale, Utah, United States
- Key people: Clint Gordon-Carroll, Alen Peacock
- Products: 1TB drive
- Website: spacemonkey.com

Space Monkey was a cloud storage company founded by Clint Gordon-Carroll and Alen Peacock in Utah in 2011.

Space Monkey was a cloud storage service that allowed a consumer to put one terabyte of data on a Space Monkey-provided hard drive located on the customer's premises. The data were then backed up on other devices across Space Monkey's user network via a distributed cloud. The service claimed to prevent data loss due to failing hardware while allowing consumers access to their files anywhere in the world via the cloud.

In September 2014, Vivint, a home automation company, acquired Space Monkey for an undisclosed amount.

== History ==
Space Monkey was founded by Clint Gordon-Carroll and Alen Peacock in 2011. Gordon-Carroll and Peacock met while both working at Mozy in 2007. A presentation by Peacock won the company first place as "Best New Startup" at the TechCrunch's Launch Festival in March 2012.

Space Monkey raised $2.7 million of venture capital in a Series A round led by Google Ventures that same year. The company went live in April 2013. It raised $349,625–350% of its initial $100,000 goal–in a 2013 Kickstarter campaign. At one time, Space Monkey was the world's largest peer-to-peer storage network.

In September 2014, Vivint acquired Space Monkey for an undisclosed amount. Although its use of Space Monkey technology was cited by Vivint as late as 2016, as of 2024 Space Monkey has no website nor apparent public presence at Vivint, but it's technology lives on in the Vivint Smart Drive product which houses video data from cameras in customers' homes and powers Vivint's Playback feature.

In 2019, after the Space Monkey founders had moved on to other pursuits, individuals inside of Vivint who had been associated with Space Monkey were able to spin the technology out into a separate company that was majority owned by Vivint. CrowdStorage continued to pursue the vision of selling storage services to compete with traditional cloud storage providers, and found some early success with partners. Eventually, CrowdStorage was acquired by Storj, where the Space Monkey IP now resides as a core part of Storj's platform.

== See also ==
- Cloud computing
- Vivint
- Web hosting
- Data storage device
