= Squirrel (disambiguation) =

The squirrel is a rodent in the family Sciuridae.

Squirrel or squirrels may also refer to:

== Animals ==
- Scaly-tailed squirrels (Anomaluridae), a group of African rodents unrelated to true (Sciuridae) squirrels
- Squirrel monkey

== Computing ==
- Squirrel (DHT), a web-caching system
- Squirrel (programming language)
- SQuirreL SQL Client, a database administration tool
- Yahoo Squirrel, former name of Yahoo Together, a messaging app by Yahoo

== People ==
- Robert "Squirrel" Lester (1942–2010), member of the singing group The Chi-Lites
- Squirrel McNutt (born 1992), American stock car racing driver
- Squirrel White (born 2004), American football player
- Leonard Squirrell (1893–1979), English artist

== Places ==
- Squirrel, Idaho, an unincorporated community
- Squirrel Creek, California
- Squirrel Creek, in Spitler Woods State Natural Area, Illinois
- Squirrel Island, Maine
- Squirrel Lake, Nova Scotia, Canada
- Squirrel River, Alaska
- The Squirrels (Highland Falls, New York), an estate on the National Register of Historic Places

== Music ==
- "The Squirrel", composed by Sir George Thomas Smart (1776–1867)
- "The Squirrel", a 1951 jazz standard composed by Tadd Dameron
- The Squirrel (album), an album by Dexter Gordon recorded in 1967
- The Squirrels, a Seattle pop band
- Squirrel Records, a UK-based record company in the 1990s

== Media ==
- The Squirrel (film), a 2026 Finnish film
- Squirrels (play), a 1974 play by David Mamet
- The Squirrels (TV series), a 1970s UK sitcom
- "Squirrels", an episode of the television series Teletubbies
- Squirrel (TV channel), a Spanish movie channel which replaced Disney Channel Spain.

== Other uses ==
- HMS Squirrel, 11 Royal Navy ships
- Squirrel (debate), debating jargon
- Squirrel (horse), a British thoroughbred racehorse
- Squirrel (peanut butter), a Canadian brand of peanut butter
- Squirrel (personal finance company)
- Squirrel, a post-World War I motorcycle produced by The Scott Motorcycle Company
- Squirrel Scouts (disambiguation), various youth organisations
- Eurocopter AS350 Écureuil (Squirrel), a light transport helicopter

== See also ==
- Squirreling, Scientology jargon for splinter groups
- Sqrl (disambiguation)
- Sqrrl
