= Programming languages used in most popular websites =

One thing the most visited websites have in common is that they are dynamic websites. Their development typically involves server-side coding, client-side coding and database technology. The programming languages applied to deliver such dynamic web content vary vastly between sites.

Programming languages used in most popular websites (Note: Data on programming languages is based on: HTTP Header information; Request for file types; Citations from reliable sources)
Websites	Popularity (unique visitors per month)	Front-end (Client-side)	Back-end (Server-side)	Database
Google	2,800,000,000	JavaScript, TypeScript	C, C++, Go, Java, Python, Node	Bigtable, MariaDB
Facebook	1,100,000,000	JavaScript, TypeScript, Flow	Hack/HHVM, PHP, Python, C++, Java, Erlang, D, Haskell	MariaDB, MySQL, HBase, Cassandra
YouTube	1,100,000,000	JavaScript, TypeScript	Python, C, C++, Java, Go	Vitess, BigTable, MariaDB
Yahoo	750,000,000	JavaScript	PHP	PostgreSQL, HBase, Cassandra, MongoDB,
Etsy	516,000,000 (Total, not unique)	JavaScript	PHP	MySQL, Redis
Amazon	2,400,000,000	JavaScript	Java, C++, Perl	DynamoDB, RDS/Aurora, Redshift
Wikipedia	475,000,000	JavaScript	PHP	MariaDB
Fandom	315,000,000	JavaScript	PHP	MySQL
X	290,000,000	JavaScript	C++, Java, Scala, Ruby (Ruby on Rails)	MySQL
Bing	285,000,000	JavaScript	C++, C#	Microsoft SQL Server, Cosmos DB
eBay	285,000,000	JavaScript	Java, JavaScript, Scala	Oracle Database
MSN	280,000,000	JavaScript	C# (ASP.NET)	Microsoft SQL Server
LinkedIn	260,000,000	JavaScript	Java, JavaScript, Scala	Venice
Pinterest	250,000,000	JavaScript	Python (Django), Erlang, Elixir	MySQL, Redis
WordPress.com	240,000,000	JavaScript	PHP	MariaDB
Netflix	223,090,000 (Subscribers, not visitors)	JavaScript	Python, Java	NMDB, PostgreSQL

Back-end (Server-side) table in most popular websites
Websites	C#	C	C++	D	Elixir	Erlang	Go	Hack	Haskell	Java	JavaScript	Perl	PHP	Python	Ruby	Scala
Google	No	Yes	Yes	No	No	No	Yes	No	No	Yes	Yes	No	No	Yes	No	No
Facebook	No	No	Yes	Yes	No	Yes	No	Yes	Yes	Yes	No	No	Yes	Yes	No	No
YouTube	No	Yes	Yes	No	No	No	Yes	No	No	Yes	No	No	No	Yes	No	No
Yahoo	No	No	No	No	No	No	No	No	No	No	No	No	Yes	No	No	No
Etsy	No	No	No	No	No	No	No	No	No	No	No	No	Yes	No	No	No
Amazon	No	No	Yes	No	No	No	No	No	No	Yes	No	Yes	No	No	No	No
Wikipedia	No	No	No	No	No	No	No	No	No	No	No	No	Yes	No	No	No
Fandom	No	No	No	No	No	No	No	No	No	No	No	No	Yes	No	No	No
X	No	No	Yes	No	No	No	No	No	No	Yes	No	No	No	No	Yes	Yes
Bing	Yes	No	Yes	No	No	No	No	No	No	No	No	No	No	No	No	No
eBay	No	No	No	No	No	No	No	No	No	Yes	Yes	No	No	No	No	Yes
MSN	Yes	No	No	No	No	No	No	No	No	No	No	No	No	No	No	No
LinkedIn	No	No	No	No	No	No	No	No	No	Yes	Yes	No	No	No	No	Yes
Pinterest	No	No	No	No	Yes	Yes	No	No	No	No	No	No	No	Yes	No	No
WordPress.com	No	No	No	No	No	No	No	No	No	No	No	No	Yes	No	No	No
Netflix	No	No	No	No	No	No	No	No	No	Yes	No	No	No	Yes	No	No

== See also ==
- Comparison of programming languages
- List of programming languages
- TIOBE index
- "Hello, World!" program
- CodeHS
