= Squirrel Creek =

Squirrel Creek may refer to:

- Squirrel Creek, California
- a watercourse in Spitler Woods State Natural Area
- Squirrel Creek (Reedy Fork tributary), a stream in Guilford County, North Carolina
- Squirrel Creek (Banister River tributary), a stream in Pittsylvania County, Virginia
