= Nightingale Group =

Class overview
- Name: Nightingale Group
- Builders: Chatham Dockyard; Portsmouth Dockyard
- Operators: Royal Navy
- Preceded by: Maidstone Group
- Succeeded by: Purchased Group
- Built: 1702–1704
- In service: 1702–1724
- Completed: 3
- Lost: 2
- Retired: 1

General characteristics
- Type: 20-gun sixth rate
- Tons burthen: 244 57/94 bm
- Length: 93 ft 0 in (28.3 m) gundeck; 77 ft 8 in (23.7 m) keel for tonnage
- Beam: 24 ft 4 in (7.4 m) for tonnage
- Depth of hold: 10 ft 8 in (3.3 m)
- Armament: 20 × 6 pdr guns on wooden trucks (UD); 4 × 4 pdr guns on wooden trucks (QD)

The Nightingale sixth rates were basically repeats of the Maidstone Group. Initially two vessels were ordered, however with one lost within months of completion a third vessel was ordered. The main difference between these and the Maidstones was the slight deck over the upper deck to improve defensibility. Their armament was similar as were the dimensions of the vessels. They were constructed between 1702 and 1704.

== Design and specifications ==
The construction of the vessels was assigned to naval dockyards. As with most vessels of this time period only order and launch dates are available. Each ship was built to the Maidstone Group generalized specification with dimensional creep accruing in all vessels. The dimensional data listed here is the general specification, whereas the actual dimensions where known will be listed with each ship. The general specification called for a gundeck of 93 feet 0 inches (28.3 metres) with a keel length of 77 feet 8 inches (23.7 metres) for tonnage calculation. The breadth would be 24 feet 4 inches (7.4 metres) for tonnage with a depth of hold of 10 feet 8 inches (3.3 metres). The tonnage calculation would be 244 57/94.

The gun armament as established in 1703 would be twenty 6-pounder cannon mounted on wooden trucks on the upper deck with four 3-pounder guns on the quarterdeck.

== Ships of the Nightingale Group ==
Name	Builder	Launch date	Remarks
Nightingale (1702)	Chatham Dockyard	16 December 1702	taken by French 1707; retaken and renamed Fox 1708; Broken up at Deptford 2 March 1724
Squirrel (1703) i	Portsmouth Dockyard	June 1703	Captured by French privateers 21 September 1703
Squirrel (1704) ii	Portsmouth Dockyard	October 1704	captured by French privateers 7 July 1706, then recaptured 1708 and foundered
