= The Squirrels (disambiguation) =

The Squirrels is an American pop band.

The Squirrels may also refer to:

- The Squirrels (Highland Falls, New York), an estate on the National Register of Historic Places
- The Squirrels (TV series), a 1970s British sitcom
- "The Squirrels", an episode from season 10 of Arthur

== See also ==
- Squirrel (disambiguation)
