= HMS Squirrel =

Eleven ships of the Royal Navy have been named HMS Squirrel after the animal, while four more carried the name while serving as fishery protection vessels. Another was planned, but was renamed before being launched.

- English ship Squirrel (1570s) was a discovery vessel perennially commanded by explorer Sir Humphrey Gilbert, and lost with all hands in 1583.
- HMS Squirrel (1694) was a 4-gun yacht launched in 1694 and sold in 1714.
- HMS Squirrel (1703) was a 20-gun sixth rate launched in 1703 and captured later that year by French privateers.
- HMS Squirrel (1704) was a 20-gun sixth rate launched in 1704. She was captured by the French in 1706 and renamed Ecureuil. She was retaken in 1708 but subsequently foundered.
- HMS Squirrel (1707) was a 24-gun sixth rate launched in 1707. She was rebuilt in 1727 and was sold in 1749.
- HMS Squirrel was to have been a 24-gun sixth rate. She was renamed HMS Alderney in 1742, and launched in 1743.
- HMS Squirrel (1755) was a 20-gun sixth rate launched in 1755 and sold in 1784. Commercial interests purchased her and renamed her Union. She then became a Greenland whaler (1784–1790), a slaver (c.1790-1795), and then made two voyages for the British East India Company.
- HMS Squirrel (1785) was a 24-gun sixth rate launched in 1785 and sold in 1817.
- HMS Squirrel (1853) was a 12-gun brig-sloop launched in 1853 and broken up in 1879.
- HMS Squirrel (1866) was a coastguard cutter built in 1866 and sold in 1905.
- HMS Squirrel (1904) was a coastguard vessel launched in 1904. She was used as a cable ship from 1914 and was sold in 1921 and renamed Vedra.
- HMS Squirrel (J301) was an Algerine-class minesweeper launched in 1944 and scuttled off Phuket Island, Thailand in 1945 after being damaged by a mine.
- HMS Squirrel was a name assigned to fishery protection vessels. The name was born in succession by:
  - HM MFV 1151 between 1948 and 1956.
  - HM MSML 2154 between 1956 and 1957.
  - HMS Rampisham between 1957 and 1959.
  - HMS Burley between 1959 and 1968.

== Battle honours ==
- Louisburg 1758
- Quebec 1758
