= Sqrl =

Sqrl may refer to:

- SQRL (pronounced 'squirrel'), an open standard for secure website login and authentication
- sqrl (born Kraig Tyler), member of U.S. rap rock band Crazy Town
- "SQRL", a 2010 song by Kids of 88 on their album Sugarpills

== See also ==
- Sqrrl
- Squirrel (disambiguation)
- Square One (disambiguation) (Sqr.1)
- SQR version 1 (SQR-1)
