= HRW (disambiguation) =

HRW usually refers to Human Rights Watch, a human rights advocacy group.

HRW may also refer to:

- Harrow & Wealdstone station, in London
- Highest random weight hashing
- Holt, Rinehart, Winston, an American publisher; now part of Holt McDougal
- Hulk Hogan's Rock 'n' Wrestling, an American animated television series
- Human right to water
- Tangga language, spoken in Papua New Guinea
