= Website =

Any web page served from a single domain

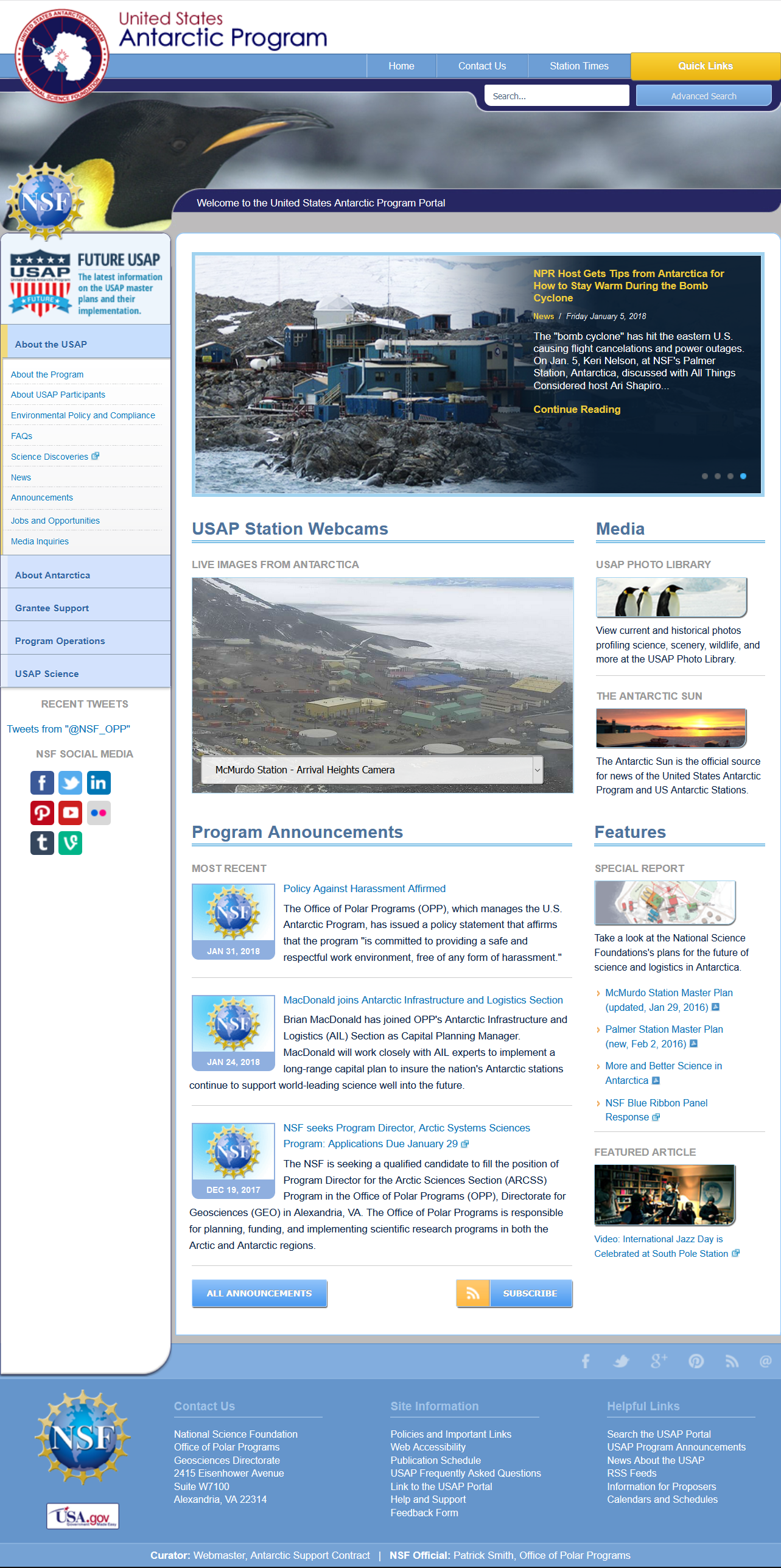
The usap.gov website

A website, occasionally written as web site, and sometimes contextually shortened to just site, is the set of one or more web pages published under a common domain name, served from a web server. They are typically dedicated to a particular topic or purpose, such as news, education, commerce, entertainment, or social media, and are usually known and referred to by a common name; often that of their respective owning organisational brand or some portion of their domain name. Viewing a website is typically done with a web browser, with hyperlinking between web pages guiding navigation, which often starts with a home page.

All publicly-accessible websites collectively constitute the World Wide Web, which is accessed via the Internet. Private websites also exist which can only be accessed within private networks, such as those found within business organisations intended for employee use only.

The most-visited sites as of July 2026, are Google, YouTube, and Facebook.

== Background ==
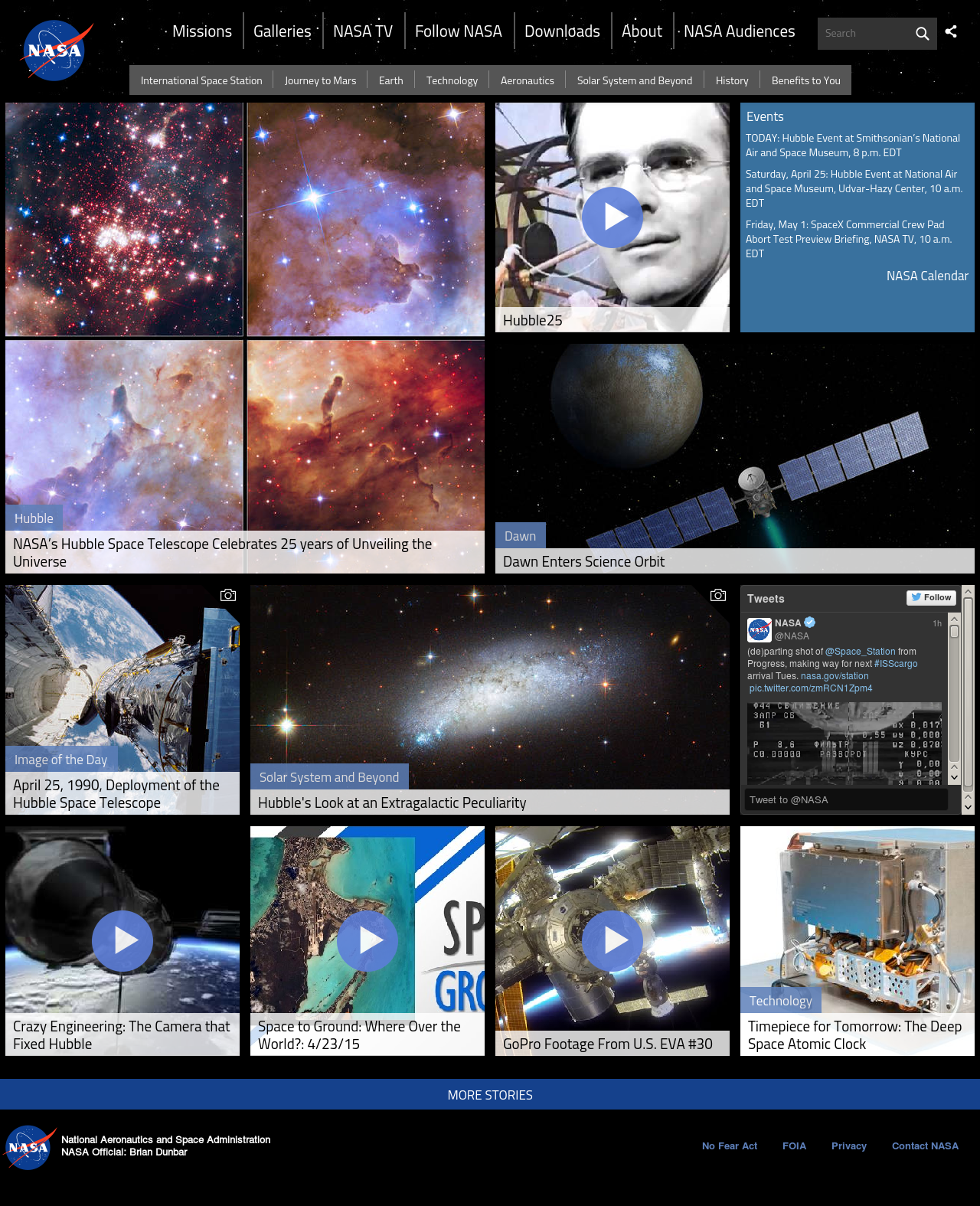
The nasa.gov home page in 2015

The World Wide Web (WWW) was created in 1989 by the British CERN computer scientist Tim Berners-Lee. On 30 April 1993, CERN announced that the World Wide Web would be free to use for anyone, contributing to the immense growth of the Web. Before the introduction of the Hypertext Transfer Protocol (HTTP), other protocols such as File Transfer Protocol and the gopher protocol were used to retrieve individual files from a server. These protocols offer a simple directory structure in which the user navigates and where they choose files to download. Documents were most often presented as plain text files without formatting or were encoded in word processor formats.

== History ==
While "web site" was the original spelling (sometimes capitalized "Web site", since "Web" is a proper noun when referring to the World Wide Web), this variant has become rarely used, and "website" has become the standard spelling. All major style guides, such as The Chicago Manual of Style and the AP Stylebook, have reflected this change.

In February 2009, Netcraft, an Internet monitoring company that has tracked Web growth since 1995, reported that there were 215,675,903 websites with domain names and content on them in 2009, compared to just 19,732 websites in August 1995. After reaching 1 billion websites in September 2014, a milestone confirmed by Netcraft in its October 2014 Web Server Survey and that Internet Live Stats was the first to announce—as attested by this tweet from the inventor of the World Wide Web himself, Tim Berners-Lee—the number of websites in the world have subsequently declined, reverting to a level below 1 billion. This is due to the monthly fluctuations in the count of inactive websites. The number of websites continued growing to over 1 billion by March 2016 and has continued growing since. Netcraft Web Server Survey in January 2020 reported that there are 1,295,973,827 websites, and in April 2021 reported that there are 1,212,139,815 sites across 10,939,637 web-facing computers, and 264,469,666 unique domains. An estimated 85 percent of all websites are inactive.

== Static website ==
A static website is one that has Web pages stored on the server in the format that is sent to a client Web browser. It is primarily coded in Hypertext Markup Language (HTML); Cascading Style Sheets (CSS) are used to control appearance beyond basic HTML. Images are commonly used to create the desired appearance and as part of the main content. Audio or video might also be considered "static" content if it plays automatically or is generally non-interactive. This type of website usually displays the same information to all visitors. Similar to handing out a printed brochure to customers or clients, a static website will generally provide consistent, standard information for an extended period of time. Although the website owner may make updates periodically, it is a manual process to edit the text, photos, and other content and may require basic website design skills and software. Simple forms or marketing examples of websites, such as a classic website, a five-page website or a brochure website are often static websites, because they present pre-defined, static information to the user. This may include information about a company and its products and services through text, photos, animations, audio/video, and navigation menus.

Static websites may still use server side includes (SSI) as an editing convenience, such as sharing a common menu bar across many pages. As the site's behavior to the reader is still static, this is not considered a dynamic site.

== Dynamic website ==
Server-side programming language usage in 2025
1. PHP (73.0%)
2. Ruby (6.40%)
3. Java (5.40%)
4. Javascript (5.30%)
5. Scala (4.80%)
6. Other (5.10%)

A dynamic website is one that changes or customizes itself frequently and automatically. Server-side dynamic pages are generated "on the fly" by computer code that produces the HTML (CSS are responsible for appearance and thus, are static files). There are a wide range of software systems, such as CGI, Java Servlets and Java Server Pages (JSP), Active Server Pages and ColdFusion (CFML) that are available to generate dynamic Web systems and dynamic sites. Various Web application frameworks and Web template systems are available for general-use programming languages like Perl, PHP, Python and Ruby to make it faster and easier to create complex dynamic websites.

A site can display the current state of a dialogue between users, monitor a changing situation, or provide information in some way personalized to the requirements of the individual user. For example, when the front page of a news site is requested, the code running on the webserver might combine stored HTML fragments with news stories retrieved from a database or another website via RSS to produce a page that includes the latest information. Dynamic sites can be interactive by using HTML forms, storing and reading back browser cookies, or by creating a series of pages that reflect the previous history of clicks. Another example of dynamic content is when a retail website with a database of media products allows a user to input a search request, e.g. for the keyword Beatles. In response, the content of the Web page will spontaneously change the way it looked before, and will then display a list of Beatles products like CDs, DVDs, and books. Dynamic HTML uses JavaScript code to instruct the Web browser how to interactively modify the page contents. One way to simulate a certain type of dynamic website while avoiding the performance loss of initiating the dynamic engine on a per-user or per-connection basis is to periodically automatically regenerate a large series of static pages.

== Multimedia and interactive content ==
Early websites had only text, and soon after, images. Web browser plug-ins were then used to add audio, video, and interactivity (such as for a rich Web application that mirrors the complexity of a desktop application like a word processor). Examples of such plug-ins are Microsoft Silverlight, Adobe Flash Player, Adobe Shockwave Player, and Java SE. HTML 5 includes provisions for audio and video without plugins. JavaScript is also built into most modern web browsers, and allows for website creators to send code to the web browser that instructs it how to interactively modify page content and communicate with the web server if needed. The browser's internal representation of the content is known as the Document Object Model (DOM).

WebGL (Web Graphics Library) is a modern JavaScript API for rendering interactive 3D graphics without the use of plug-ins. It allows interactive content such as 3D animations, visualizations and video explainers to presented users in the most intuitive way.

A 2010-era trend in websites called "responsive design" has given the best viewing experience as it provides a device-based layout for users. These websites change their layout according to the device or mobile platform, thus giving a rich user experience.

== Types ==
Websites can be divided into two broad categories—static and interactive. Interactive sites are part of the Web 2.0 community of sites and allow for interactivity between the site owner and site visitors or users. Static sites serve or capture information but do not allow engagement with the audience or users directly. Some websites are informational or produced by enthusiasts or for personal use or entertainment. Many websites do aim to make money using one or more business models, including:

- Posting interesting content and selling contextual advertising either through direct sales or through an advertising network.
- E-commerce: products or services are purchased directly through the website
- Advertising products or services available at a brick-and-mortar business
- Freemium: basic content is available free, but premium content requires a payment (e.g., WordPress website, it is an open-source platform to build a blog or website).
- Some websites require user registration or subscription to access the content. Examples of subscription websites include many business sites, news websites, academic journal websites, gaming websites, file-sharing websites, message boards, Web-based email, social networking websites, websites providing real-time stock market data, as well as sites providing various other services.

== See also ==
- Bulletin board system – Type of computer server system
- Link rot – URLs ceasing to function
- Lists of websites
- Site map – List of pages of a web site
- Web content management system – Content management system specifically for web content
- Web design – Creation and maintenance of websites
- Web development – Development of websites and web apps
- Web development tools – Software used to help develop a website or web application
- Web framework – Software framework to support the development of websites
- Web hosting service – Service for hosting websites
- Web template system – System in web publishing
- Website governance – Systems and policies to maintain websites
- Website monetization
- World Wide Web Consortium – International standards organization
