= Apache Phoenix =

Relational database engine for Apache Hadoop

- Developer: Apache Software Foundation
- Initial release: 15 April 2014; 11 years ago
Stable release
- 4.x: 4.16.1 / 22 May 2021; 4 years ago
- 5.x: 5.2.1 / 12 November 2024; 13 months ago
- Repository: Phoenix Repository
- Written in: Java, SQL
- Operating system: Cross-platform
- Type: SQL database
- License: Apache License 2.0
- Website: phoenix.apache.org

Apache Phoenix is an open source, massively parallel, relational database engine supporting OLTP for Hadoop using Apache HBase as its backing store. Phoenix provides a JDBC driver that hides the intricacies of the NoSQL store enabling users to create, delete, and alter SQL tables, views, indexes, and sequences; insert and delete rows singly and in bulk; and query data through SQL. Phoenix compiles queries and other statements into native NoSQL store APIs rather than using MapReduce enabling the building of low latency applications on top of NoSQL stores.

== History ==
Phoenix began as an internal project by the company salesforce.com out of a need to support a higher level, well understood, SQL language. It was originally open-sourced on GitHub on 28 Jan 2014 and became a top-level Apache project on 22 May 2014. Apache Phoenix is included in the Cloudera Data Platform 7.0 and above, Hortonworks distribution for HDP 2.1 and above, is available as part of Cloudera labs, and is part of the Hadoop ecosystem.

== See also ==
- Apache HBase
- Apache Hadoop
