= DataStax =

Data management company

- Logo used since 2023
- Type: Private
- Industry: Database Technologies
- Genre: Multi-Model DBMS
- Founded: April 2010
- Founder: Jonathan Ellis; Matt Pfeil
- Headquarters: Santa Clara, CA, United States
- Key people: Chet Kapoor (CEO); Davor Bonaci (CTO); Ed Anuff (CPO); Don Dixon (CFO); Brad Gyger (CRO); Jason McClelland (CMO); Chris Vogel (CPO)
- Number of employees: 800+ (June 2022)
- Website: www.datastax.com

DataStax, Inc. is a real-time data for AI company based in Santa Clara, California. Its product Astra DB is a cloud database-as-a-service based on Apache Cassandra. DataStax also offers DataStax Enterprise (DSE), an on-premises database built on Apache Cassandra, and Astra Streaming, a messaging and event streaming cloud service based on Apache Pulsar. As of June 2022, the company has roughly 800 customers distributed in over 50 countries.

== History ==
DataStax was built on the open source NoSQL database Apache Cassandra. Cassandra was initially developed internally at Facebook to handle large data sets across multiple servers, and was released as an Apache open source project in 2008. In 2010, Jonathan Ellis and Matt Pfeil left Rackspace, where they had worked with Cassandra, to launch Riptano in Austin, Texas. Ellis and Pfeil later renamed the company DataStax, and moved its headquarters to Santa Clara, California.

The company went on to create its own enterprise version of Cassandra, a NoSQL database called DataStax Enterprise (DSE).

In 2019, Chet Kapoor was named the company's new CEO, taking over from Billy Bosworth.

Original logo

In May 2020, DataStax released Astra DB, a DBaaS for Cassandra applications. In November 2020, DataStax released K8ssandra, an open source distribution of Cassandra on Kubernetes. In December 2020, DataStax released Stargate, an open source data API gateway.

After acquiring streaming event vendor Kesque in January 2021, the company launched Luna Streaming, a data streaming platform for Apache Pulsar. DataStax then rebuilt the Kesque technology into Astra Streaming. The Astra Streaming cloud service became generally available on June 29, 2022. With the release, the company added API-level support for messaging tools Apache Kafka, RabbitMQ and Java Message Service, in addition to Apache Pulsar. Astra Streaming can connect to a larger data platform by utilizing DataStax's Astra DB cloud service.

Starting in 2023, DataStax began incorporating artificial intelligence and machine learning into its platform. In January 2023, the company acquired Kaskada, developer of a platform that helps organizations use data for AI applications. DataStax made the formerly proprietary Kaskada technology open source, and integrated it into its Luna ML service, which was launched on May 4, 2023. With the acquisition, former Kaskada CEO Davor Bonaci was named DataStax chief technology officer and executive vice president.

On May 24, 2023, DataStax announced that it would be partnering with ThirdAI to bring large language models to DSE and AstraDB, to help developers develop generative AI applications.

In June 2023, the company announced the development of a GPT-based schema translator in its Astra Streaming cloud service. The Astra Streaming GPT Schema Translator uses generative AI to automatically generate schema mappings, to enable data integration and interoperability between multiple systems and data sources.

On July 18, 2023, the company announced a partnership with Google to make semantic search available in its Astra DB cloud database for developers building generative AI applications.

On September 13, 2023, DataStax launched the LangStream open source project, which works with Astra DB and supports vector databases including Milvus and Pinecone. LangStream enables developers to better work with streaming data sources, using Apache Kafka technology and generative AI to help build event-driven architectures.

In November 2023, DataStax announced RAGStack, a simplified commercial offering for RAG (retrieval-augmented generation) based on LangChain and Astra DB vector search.

On February 25, 2025, IBM announced its intention to acquire DataStax.

On May 28, 2025, IBM announced that it had officially acquired DataStax.

== Products ==
=== Astra DB ===
Astra DB is available on cloud services such as Microsoft Azure, Amazon Web Services, and Google Cloud Platform. In February 2021, DataStax announced the serverless version of Astra DB, offering developers pay-as-you-go data.

In March 2022, DataStax introduced new change data capture (CDC) capabilities to its Astra DB cloud service. Astra DB CDC is powered by Apache Pulsar, which allows developers to manage operational and streaming data in one place. DataStax leads the open-source Starlight, which provides a compatibility layer for different protocols on top of Apache Pulsar.

On February 8, 2023, DataStax launched Astra Block, a cloud-based service based on the Ethereum blockchain to support building Web3 applications, available as part of Astra DB. Astra Block can be used by developers to stream enhanced data from the Ethereum blockchain to build or scale Web3 experiences on Astra DB.

Astra DB supports open source LangChain technology, making it easier for developers to create generative AI applications.

=== DSE ===
Version 1.0 of the DataStax Enterprise (DSE), released in October 2011, was the first commercial distribution of the Cassandra database, designed to provide real-time application performance and heavy analytics on the same physical infrastructure. It grew to include advanced security controls, graph database models, operational analytics and advanced search capabilities.

In April 2016, the company announced the release of DataStax Enterprise Graph, adding graph data model functionality to DSE.

In March 2017, DataStax announced the release of its DSE platform 5.1, which included improved search capabilities, improved security control, improvements to its Graph data management and improvements to operational analytics performance. DataStax also announced a shift in strategy, with an added focus on customer experience applications. Rather than a new set of technologies, the company started to offer advice on best practice to users of its core DSE platform.

In April 2018, DataStax released DSE 6, with the new version focused on businesses using a hybrid cloud computing model, with all the benefits of a distributed cloud database on any public cloud or on-premise, twice the responsiveness and ability to handle twice the throughput.

In December 2018, DataStax released DSE 6.7, which offers enterprise customers five key new feature upgrades, including: improved analytics, geospatial search, improved data protection in the cloud, enhanced performance insights and new developer integration tools with Apache Kafka Connector and certified production Docker images.

In April 2020, DataStax released DSE 6.8, offering enterprises new capabilities for bare-metal performance and to support more workloads, and serving as a Kubernetes operator for Cassandra.

DSE 7.0 was introduced in August 2023. It offers enhancements in cloud-native operations and generative AI capabilities, and includes vector search.

== Funding and IPO ==
In September 2014, DataStax raised $106 million in a Series E funding round, raising the total investment in the company to $190 million. On June 15, 2022, the company announced it had raised an additional $115 million, at a $1.6 billion valuation.

In 2020, Mergermarket reported that DataStax was preparing for an initial public offering that could launch in 2021. However, in June 2022, DataStax CEO Chet Kapoor said that the company would not rush into an IPO.

== See also ==
- Apache Cassandra
- Wide-column store
