= HMS Rampisham =

Minesweeper of the Royal Navy

History

United Kingdom
- Name: HMS Rampisham
- Namesake: Rampisham
- Builder: J. Bolson, Poole
- Launched: 1 May 1957
- Completed: 18 October 1957
- Fate: Sold August 1966

General characteristics
- Class & type: Ham-class minesweeper
- Notes: Pennant number(s): M2786 / IMS86

HMS Rampisham was one of 93 ships of the Ham-class of inshore minesweepers.

Their names were all chosen from villages ending in -ham. The minesweeper was named after Rampisham in Dorset.

She was renamed HMS Squirrel in December 1957, and reverted to Rampisham in December 1959.
