= Squirrel (personal finance company) =

British online personal budgeting service company

- Industry: Personal finance, Software
- Founded: 2014
- Founders: Mutaz Qubbaj, Emanuel Andjelic
- Headquarters: Regent Street; London, W1; United Kingdom
- Area served: United Kingdom
- Products: web application
- Revenue: N/A
- Website: www.squirrel.me

Squirrel was a British company that provided an online personal budgeting service. The company claimed that it had several thousand users in the United Kingdom. It was described by Liat Clark in Wired magazine as a "total savings, budgeting and bill management tool".

Squirrel was designed by co-founders Mutaz Qubbaj and Emanuel Andjelic. Their company is working with The Money Advice Service. Squirrel has also been provided by companies such as O2, London City Airport and the NHS as an employee benefit and cited by the Secretary of State for Foreign and Commonwealth Affairs Boris Johnson as an example of London's technology development. The service has processed over £2 million since launching

== Operation ==
Squirrel users must get paid into a Squirrel bank account each month. Money allocated in Squirrel by the user as savings is saved into a users “savings goals”. Money allocated for bills is held by Squirrel, then paid into a users high street current account the day before bills are due. Spending money is sent on to the users current account as normal. Users can also choose for spending money to split into five parts- allowing for spending money to be paid to the user weekly - which is intended to make budgeting easier.

== Awards ==
In 2014 Squirrel won a "Pitch@Palace" award from The Duke Of York.
