= Voldemort (distributed data store) =

Distributed database used by LinkedIn

Project Voldemort
- Original author: LinkedIn / Microsoft
- Release: 2009; 17 years ago
- Stable release: 1.10.25 / July 25, 2017; 9 years ago
- Written in: Java
- Available in: English
- Type: Distributed data store
- License: Apache License 2.0
- Website: www.project-voldemort.com
- Repository: github.com/voldemort/voldemort

Voldemort is a distributed data store that was designed as a key-value store used by LinkedIn for highly-scalable storage. It is named after the fictional Harry Potter villain Lord Voldemort.

== Overview ==
Voldemort does not try to satisfy arbitrary relations and the ACID properties, but rather is a big, distributed, persistent hash table. A 2012 study comparing systems for storing application performance management data reported that Voldemort, Apache Cassandra, and HBase all offered linear scalability in most cases, with Voldemort having the lowest latency and Cassandra having the highest throughput.

In the parlance of Eric Brewer's CAP theorem, Voldemort is an AP type system.

Voldemort's creator and primary corporate contributor, LinkedIn, has migrated all of their systems off of Voldemort as of approximately August 2018, with no replacement sponsor as of October 2018. In 2022, LinkedIn announced Project Venice as an open source replacement

== Properties ==
Voldemort uses in-memory caching to eliminate a separate caching tier. It has a storage layer that is possible to emulate. Voldemort reads and writes scale horizontally. The API decides data replication and placement and accommodates a wide range of application-specific strategies.

The Voldemort distributed data store supports pluggable placement strategies for distribution across data centers. Data is automatically replicated across servers. Data is partitioned meaning a single server contains only a portion of the total data. Each data node is independent to avoid central point of failure. Pluggable serialization allows rich keys and values including lists and tuples with named fields, as well as the integration with common serialisation frameworks such as Avro, Java Serialization, Protocol Buffers, and Thrift. Server failures are handled transparently. Data items are versioned, which maximizes data integrity.

== See also ==
- Distributed data store
- NoSQL
- Riak
- Redis
