= Hypertable =

Open-source software project

- Developer: Zvents Inc.
- Final release: 0.9.8.11 / March 14, 2016; 10 years ago
- Written in: C++
- Operating system: Linux, Mac OS X
- Type: associative array datastore / wide column store
- License: GNU General Public License 3.0
- Website: www.hypertable.com

Hypertable was an open-source software project to implement a database management system inspired by publications on the design of Google's Bigtable.

Hypertable runs on top of a distributed file system such as the Apache HDFS, GlusterFS or the CloudStore Kosmos File System (KFS). It is written almost entirely in C++ as the developers believed it had significant performance advantages over Java.

Hypertable software was originally developed at the company Zvents before 2008. Doug Judd was a promoter of Hypertable. In January 2009, Baidu, the Chinese language search engine, became a project sponsor. A version 0.9.2.1 was described in a blog in February, 2009. Development ended in March, 2016.
