= Data store =

Repository for data collection storage and management

A data store is a repository for persistently storing and managing collections of data which include not just repositories like databases, but also simpler store types such as simple files, emails, etc.

A database is a collection of data that is managed by a database management system (DBMS), though the term can sometime more generally refer to any collection of data that is stored and accessed electronically. A file is a series of bytes that is managed by a file system. Thus, any database or file is a series of bytes that, once stored, is called a data store.

MATLAB and Cloud Storage systems like VMware, Firefox OS use datastore as a term for abstracting collections of data inside their respective applications.

== Types ==
Data store can refer to a broad class of storage systems including:

- Paper files
- Simple files like a spreadsheet
- File systems
- Email storage systems (both server and client systems)
- Databases
  - Relational databases, based on the relational model of data
  - Object-oriented databases. They can save objects of an object-oriented design.
  - NoSQL databases
    - Key–value databases
    - Wide-column stores
    - Graph databases
- Distributed data stores
- Directory services
- VMware uses the term datastore to refer to a file that stores a virtual machine

== See also ==
- Data architecture
- Data flow diagram
- Database
- Distributed data store
