= Rocket Fuel Inc. =

Big data companies

- Type: Private
- Industry: Marketing and Advertising
- Founded: 2008; 18 years ago
- Founders: George John, Richard Frankel, Abhinav Gupta
- Headquarters: Redwood City, CA, US
- Number of locations: 20
- Area served: North America, Europe, and Japan; 20,000 advertisers and 3,600 advertising agencies
- Key people: Randy Wootton, CEO; Simon Hayhurst, VP Product
- Number of employees: 700+

Rocket Fuel was an ad technology company based in Redwood City, California. It was founded in 2008 by alumni of Yahoo!.

Rocket Fuel completed an initial public offering in September 2013. The initial stock offering was $29 per share and reached a high of $59.95 per share when the stock opened. The stock closed at $56.10 per share on opening day, giving the company a value of $942.5 million. By February 24, 2015, the stock had dropped to $9.63, or 86 percent below its record high and 67 percent below its IPO price.

Rocket Fuel acquired the New York-based ad tech company [x+1] in August 2014 for $230 million.

In 2017, the company was acquired by Sizmek, a private ad tech company owned by Vector Capital; one outcome of this was a retreat from public company status back to being a private company.

In November 2017, Sizmek retired the brand Rocket Fuel.
