= Squirrel Scouts =

Squirrel Scouts may refer to:

- Squirrel Scouts (The Scout Association), a program for four-to-six year-old infants, operated by The Scout Association in the United Kingdom
  - Northern Ireland Squirrel Association, a predecessor to the UK-wide Squirrel Scout section
- Individual members of squirrel colonies who seek out new habitats
- Fictional youth organizations:
  - Squirrel Scouts, an analog for Girl Scouts, based in the Acorn Flats summer camp in Camp Lazlo
  - Squirrel Scouts, a youth group featured in an episode of Little Lulu
  - Squirrel Scouts and Seaweed Masks, a season 2 episode of Tyler Perry's Young Dylan
  - Squirrel Camp and Squirrel Scouts, from The Kids from Room 402

== See also ==
- The Squirrel Club, an analog of Scouts from Hey Duggee
- Squirrelly Scouts, a youth group in The Fairly OddParents
