= Wide-column store =

Type of database

A wide-column store (or extensible record store) is a type of NoSQL database. It uses tables, rows, and columns, but unlike a relational database, the names and format of the columns can vary from row to row in the same table. A wide-column store can be interpreted as a two-dimensional key–value store. Google's Bigtable is one of the prototypical examples of a wide-column store.

== Definition ==
The name column-store historically referred to databases like C-Store, which was a column-oriented relational database. It eventually came to refer to Bigtable, Apache Cassandra, and similar systems, which also store groups of columns ("column families") together, but ditch the relational model.

A wide-column store is a 2-level structure where each value is identified by 2 keys: the first key acts as a row identifier and the second acts as a column identifier. Columns are grouped together into column-families, which are physically stored together on disk. The top-level structure of a wide-column store is called a keyspace, and column families are contained within this structure. A wide-column database may also have supercolumns, which contain a map to other columns, this creating a nest column.

The column families of a row may not necessarily be stored together on disk, but the columns within a column family are stored together. A row is made up of a set of keys and values, which may span several column families, a column family is often likened to a table in a relational database.

=== Versus document databases ===
Compared to a document databases, wide-column databases divide each record into column families that the database recognizes as separate units. This additional structure allows the database to organize into a two-dimensional structure, whereas document databases generally treat the entire document as the unit of storage and optimization despite allowing queries and partial retrievals of individual fields.

=== Versus relational databases ===
Besides being denormalized, a wide-column database's structure is not as fixed as relational database, allowing dynamically adding columns, as well as allowing rows to have varying columns.

== Notable examples ==
Notable wide-column stores include:

- Apache Accumulo
- Apache Cassandra
- Apache HBase
- Bigtable
- DataStax Enterprise (uses Apache Cassandra)
- DataStax Astra DB (uses Apache Cassandra)
- Hypertable
- Azure Tables
- ScyllaDB
