= Cache Array Routing Protocol =

The Cache Array Routing Protocol (CARP) is used in load-balancing HTTP requests across multiple proxy cache servers. It works by generating a hash for each URL requested. A different hash is generated for each URL and by splitting the hash namespace into equal parts (or unequal parts if uneven load is intended) the overall number of requests can be distributed to multiple servers.

Implementations include Apache Traffic Server, Squid (software) and the Microsoft Internet Security and Acceleration Server as well as F5 Networks BIG-IP devices.
