= Sqrrl =

Cyber security company

- Type: Subsidiary
- Industry: Cybersecurity, Network security
- Founded: 2012
- Headquarters: Cambridge, Massachusetts
- Parent: Amazon
- Website: www.sqrrl.com (defunct)

Sqrrl Data, Inc. was an American company founded in 2012 that marketed software for big data analytics and cyber security. The company has roots in the United States Intelligence Community and National Security Agency. Sqrrl was involved in the creation of, and actively contributes to Apache Accumulo and other related Apache projects. Sqrrl’s primary product is its threat hunting platform, designed for active detection of advanced persistent threats.

In January 2018, Sqrrl was acquired by Amazon.

== History ==
Most of Sqrrl’s founders previously worked for the National Security Agency; CEO and Co-Founder Oren Falkowitz, formerly of the United States Cyber Command and Co-Founder Ely Kahn, former director of US cybersecurity policy. Sqrrl's platform relies on the open-source Apache Accumulo technology. Accumulo began development in 2008 and went open source in 2011; Sqrrl was founded in the summer of 2012 to use Accumulo for cybersecurity. Sqrrl was founded in Washington, D.C., but quickly moved to Cambridge, Massachusetts.

In August 2012, Sqrrl announced a $2 million seed round led by Accomplice (formerly Atlas Venture) and Matrix Partners.

In October 2013, Sqrrl received $5.2 million in funding led by Accomplice and Matrix Partners.

In February 2015, Sqrrl raised another $7.1 million funding for its linked data analysis toolkit.

On January 24, 2018, it was reported that Sqrrl had been acquired by Amazon and would become a part of Amazon Web Services.

== Threat hunting platform ==
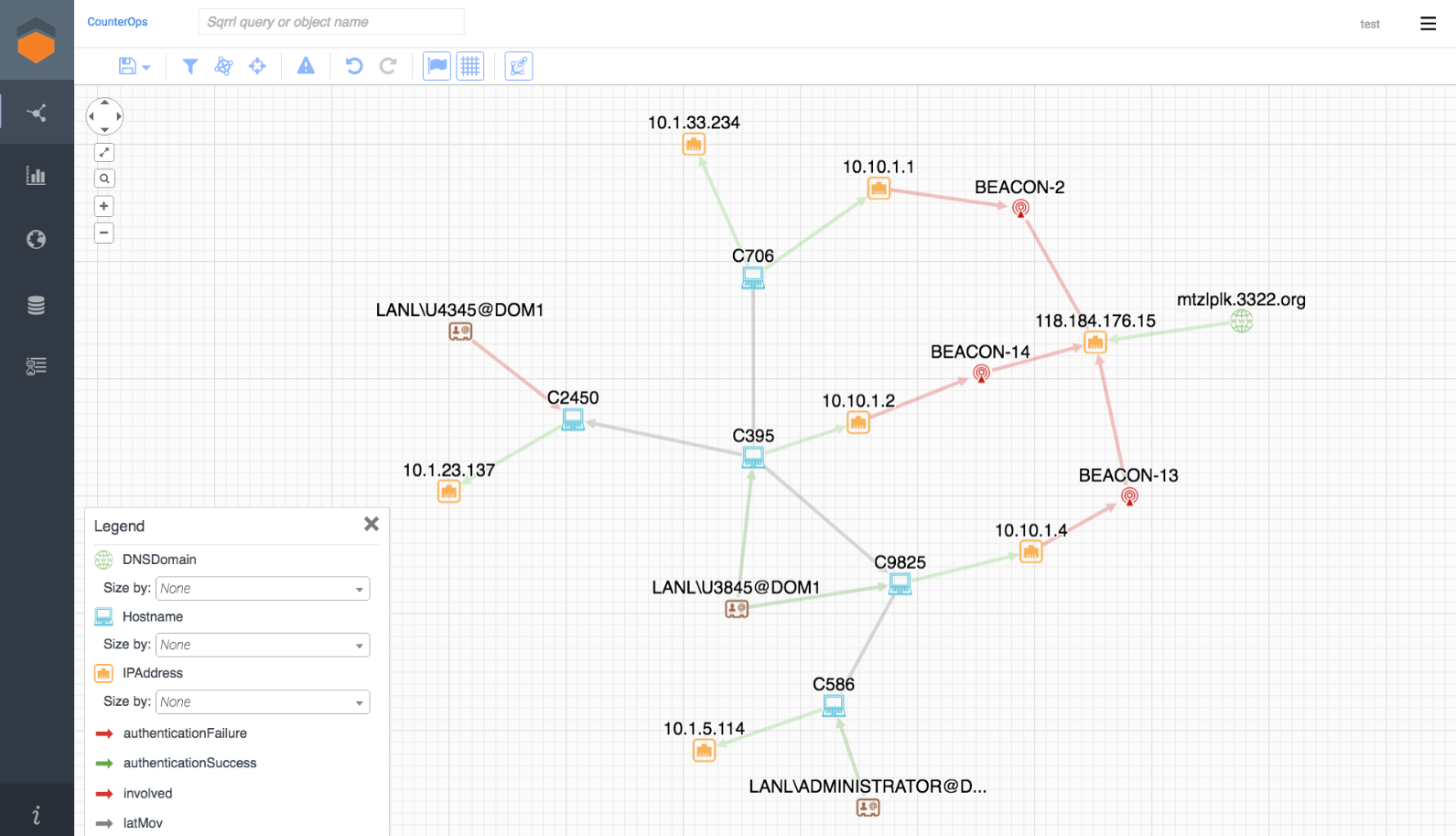
An example of Sqrrl's visual behavior graph, displaying user and entity activity on a network.

Sqrrl’s main product is a visual cyber threat hunting platform which combines technology such as link analysis and user behavior analytics. User, entity, asset, and event data are combined into a behavior graph which users navigate to respond to security incidents as well as search for undetected threats. Sqrrl integrates into Security Information and Event Management (SIEM) systems, such as IBM's QRadar. The platform also integrates machine learning and risk-scoring.

== Awards ==
Sqrrl was mentioned in cyber security industry marketing, such as SC Mag’s Top Innovator award in 2015 and 2016 and a 2017 Cybersecurity Excellence Award in a new "Threat Hunting" category.

== See also ==
- Apache Software Foundation
- Big data
- Bigtable
- Cyber threat hunting
- MapReduce
- Real-time database
- User behavior analytics
