= HMS Squirrel (1703) =

British warship

History

England
- Name: HMS Squirrel
- Ordered: 1702
- Builder: Royal Dockyard, Portsmouth
- Launched: 14 June 1703
- Commissioned: 1703
- Captured: 21 September 1703
- Fate: Taken by French privateers off Hythe

General characteristics
- Type: 20-gun Sixth Rate
- Tons burthen: 258 82/94 bm
- Length: 93 ft 6 in (28.5 m) gundeck; 78 ft 9 in (24.0 m) keel for tonnage
- Beam: 24 ft 8 in (7.5 m) for tonnage
- Depth of hold: 10 ft 8 in (3.3 m)
- Armament: 20 × 6-pdrs on wooden trucks (UD); 4 × 3-pdr on wooden trucks (QD)

HMS Squirrel was a development of the standardize 20-gun sixth rates and was built at the beginning of the 18th Century. After commissioning she was captured by French privateers off Hythe in September 1703.

Squirrel was the third named ship since it was used for a discovery vessel with Sir Humphrey Gilbert in 1682 and lost in 1583.

== Construction ==
She was ordered on in 1702 from Portsmouth Dockyard to be built under the guidance of their Master Shipwright, Thomas Podd. She was launched on 14 June 1703.

== Commissioned service ==
She was commissioned in 1703 under the command of Commander Gilbert Talbot, RN.

== Disposition ==
She was taken by French privateers off Hythe on 21 September 1703.
