= Squirrel Creek, California =

Squirrel Creek
- Former settlement
- Location in California
- Coordinates: 39°47′41″N 120°43′04″W
- Country: United States
- State: California
- County: Plumas
- Elevation: 5,407 ft (1,648 m)

Squirrel Creek is a former settlement in Plumas County, California, United States. It lay at an elevation of 5407 feet (1648 m). Squirrel Creek is located 8 miles (12.9 km) west-northwest of Clio. It still appeared on maps as of 1897.
