= Spitler Woods State Natural Area =

State park in Illinois, USA

- Location within Illinois Location within the United States
- Location: Macon County, Illinois, United States
- Nearest city: Mount Zion, Illinois
- Coordinates: 39°46′40″N 88°51′25″W
- Area: 202.5 acres (81.9 ha)
- Established: 1937
- Governing body: Illinois Department of Natural Resources

Spitler Woods State Natural Area is a 202.5-acre (81.9 ha) state park located adjacent to Mount Zion, Illinois. The state park is located within the Decatur, Illinois metropolitan area. The eastern two-thirds of the state park is a listed Illinois Nature Preserve noted for its old-growth forest grove of white oak and hickory. The park is managed by the Illinois Department of Natural Resources (IDNR).

Spitler Woods contains two trails totaling 2.5 miles (4.0 km) in length. Hikers can investigate the loessy soil forming the banks of Squirrel Creek, one of the tiny tributaries that eventually come together to form Lake Decatur and the Sangamon River. The woods are filled with squirrels, who eat the acorns and other mast shed by the old-growth hardwoods. Although deer live in the natural area, hunting is forbidden.

The preserve includes many tree species, such as white oak (Quercus alba), chinkapin oak (Q. muehlenbergii), bur oak (Q. macrocarpa), black oak (Q. velutina), red oak (Q. rubra), sugar maple (Acer saccharum), shagbark hickory (Carya ovata), bitternut hickory (C. cordiformis), mockernut hickory (C. tomentosa), black walnut (Juglans nigra), basswood (Tilia americana), American elm (Ulmus americana), slippery elm (U. rubra), Ohio buckeye (Aesculus glabra), sycamore (Platanus occidentalis), hophornbeam (Ostrya virginiana), black cherry (Prunus serotina), and white ash (Fraxinus americana). Other woody plants include bladdernut (Staphylea trifolia), spicebush (Lindera benzoin), pawpaw (Asimina triloba), blackhaw (Viburnum prunifolium), eastern redbud (Cercis canadensis), hawthorn (Crataegus spp.), Virginia creeper (Parthenocissus quinquefolia), and poison-ivy (Toxicodendron radicans).

The park is adjacent to, and has signed access from, Illinois Route 121. It is named in honor of Ida B. Spitler, who donated Spitler Woods to the state of Illinois in 1937.

The park's headquarters is 705 Spitler Park Drive, Mount Zion IL 62549.
