= HMS Squirrel (1704) =

British warship

History

England
- Name: HMS Squirrel
- Ordered: 1703
- Builder: Royal Dockyard, Portsmouth
- Launched: 28 October 1704
- Commissioned: 1703
- Captured: 7 July 1706
- Fate: Taken by French privateers off the Goodwins, recaptured 5 March 1708 and foundered

General characteristics
- Type: 20-gun Sixth Rate
- Tons burthen: 258 85/94 bm
- Length: 93 ft 6 in (28.5 m) gundeck; 80 ft 0 in (24.4 m) keel for tonnage
- Beam: 24 ft 8 in (7.5 m) for tonnage
- Depth of hold: 10 ft 8 in (3.3 m)
- Armament: 20 × 6-pdrs on wooden trucks (UD); 4 × 3-pdr on wooden trucks (QD)

HMS Squirrel was a development of the standardize 20-gun sixth rates and were built at the beginning of the 18th Century. After commissioning she was assigned to the Channel and the Bay of Biscay. She was captured by French privateers off the Goodwins in 1706. She was recaptured during the French attempt to invade Scotland on 15 March 1708 and foundered.

Squirrel was the fourth named ship since it was used for a discovery vessel with Sir Humphrey Gilbert in 1682 and lost in 1583.

== Construction ==
She was ordered on in 1703 from Portsmouth Dockyard to be built under the guidance of their Master Shipwright, Thomas Podd. She was launched on 28 October 1704.

== Commissioned service ==
She was commissioned in 1705 under the command of Commander Robert Jackson, RN for service in the English Channel and Bay of Biscay. In 1706 Commander Danial Butler, RN took command. She was taken by French privateers off the Goodwins on 7 July 1706. She entered the French Navy as L'Ecureuil. She was recaptured during an attempt by Forbin to invade Scotland in 1708.

== Disposition ==
She was recaptured on 15 March 1708 and foundered.
