= The Squirrels (Highland Falls, New York) =

Historic house in New York, United States

- U.S. National Register of Historic Places
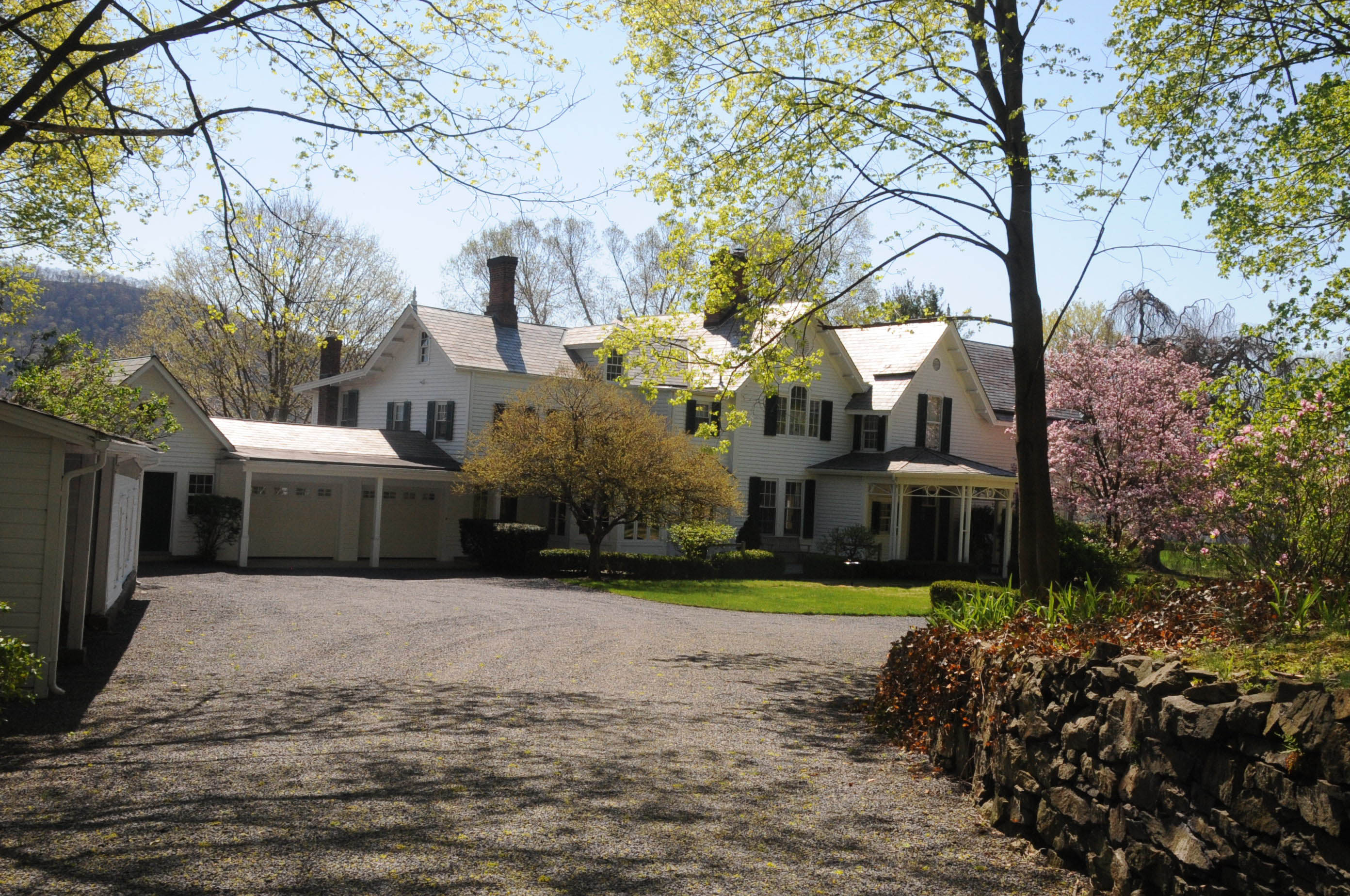

- Location within New York Location within the United States
- Location: 225 Main St., Highland Falls, New York
- Coordinates: 41.367766°N 73.962961°W
- Area: 12 acres (4.9 ha)
- Built: 1845; 1857
- Architect: Calvert Vaux
- Architectural style: Gothic Revival
- MPS: Hudson Highlands MRA
- NRHP reference No.: 82001226
- Added to NRHP: November 23, 1982

The Squirrels is a historic estate located at Highland Falls in Orange County, New York. It was built about 1845 and is a two-story frame and clapboard structure with a multi-gabled roof. A two-story frame wing was added to the original farmhouse in 1857 and the house redesigned by architect Calvert Vaux. Also on the property is a one-story gatehouse with a hipped roof. The estate was owned and the house expanded by John Bigelow (1817–1911).

It was listed on the National Register of Historic Places in 1982.
