= Bigtable =

Cloud-based NoSQL database service

Google Bigtable
- Developer: Google
- Release: February 2005; 21 years ago
- Written in: C++ (core), Java, Python, Go, Ruby
- Platform: Google Cloud Platform
- Type: NoSQL Database, data store
- License: Proprietary
- Website: cloud.google.com/bigtable/

Bigtable is a fully managed wide-column and key-value NoSQL database service for large analytical and operational workloads as part of the Google Cloud portfolio.

== History ==
Bigtable development began in 2004. It is now used by a number of Google applications, such as Google Analytics, web indexing, MapReduce, which is often used for generating and modifying data stored in Bigtable, Google Maps, Google Books search, "My Search History", Google Earth, Blogger.com, Google Code hosting, YouTube, and Gmail. Google's reasons for developing its own database include scalability and better control of performance characteristics.

Apache HBase and Cassandra are some of the best known open source projects that were modeled after Bigtable. Bigtable offers HBase and Cassandra compatible APIs.

On 6 May 2015, a public version of Bigtable was made available as a part of Google Cloud under the name Cloud Bigtable.

As of April 2024, Bigtable manages over 10 Exabytes of data and serves more than 7 billion requests per second. Since its launch, Google announced a number of updates to Bigtable, including SQL support, incremental materialized views, global secondary indexes and automated scalability.

== Design ==
Bigtable is one of the prototypical examples of a wide-column store. It maps two arbitrary string values (row key and column key) and timestamp (hence three-dimensional mapping) into an associated arbitrary byte array. It is not a relational database and can be better defined as a sparse, distributed multi-dimensional sorted map. It is built on Colossus (Google File System), Chubby Lock Service, SSTable (log-structured storage like LevelDB) and a few other Google technologies. Bigtable is designed to scale into the petabyte range across "hundreds or thousands of machines, and to make it easy to add more machines [to] the system and automatically start taking advantage of those resources without any reconfiguration". For example, Google's copy of the web can be stored in a bigtable where the row key is a domain-reversed URL, and columns describe various properties of a web page, with one particular column holding the page itself. The page column can have several timestamped versions describing different copies of the web page timestamped by when they were fetched. Each cell of a bigtable can have zero or more timestamped versions of the data. Another function of the timestamp is to allow for both versioning and garbage collection of expired data.

Tables are split into multiple tablets – segments of the table are split at certain row keys so that each tablet is a few hundred megabytes or a few gigabytes in size. A bigtable is somewhat like a mapreduce worker pool in that thousands to hundreds of thousands of tablet shards may be served by hundreds to thousands of BigTable servers. When Table size threaten to grow beyond a specified limit, the tablets may be compressed using the algorithm BMDiff and the Zippy compression algorithm publicly known and open-sourced as Snappy, which is a less space-optimal variation of LZ77 but more efficient in terms of computing time. The locations in the GFS of tablets are recorded as database entries in multiple special tablets, which are called "META1" tablets. META1 tablets are found by querying the single "META0" tablet, which typically resides on a server of its own since it is often queried by clients as to the location of the "META1" tablet which itself has the answer to the question of where the actual data is located. Like GFS's master server, the META0 server is not generally a bottleneck since the processor time and bandwidth necessary to discover and transmit META1 locations is minimal and clients aggressively cache locations to minimize queries.

== Bibliography ==
- Chang, Fay; Dean, Jeffrey; Ghemawat, Sanjay; Hsieh, Wilson C.; Wallach, Deborah A.; Burrows, Mike; Chandra, Tushar; Fikes, Andrew; Gruber, Robert E. (2006). Bigtable: A Distributed Storage System for Structured Data (PDF). 7th USENIX Symposium on Operating Systems Design and Implementation (OSDI'06). Seattle, WA.
