= File sharing in Japan =

Sharing of files in the country of Japan

File sharing in Japan is notable for both its size and sophistication.

The Recording Industry Association of Japan has used a 2010 study to suggest that illegal downloads (which have been illegal since 2010) outnumber legal ones 10:1.

In 2012, a law was passed that would invoke penalties for accessing pirated music or movies.

In 2020, the National Diet passed a law expanding the penalties to the download of manga, academic texts, and magazines, as well as banning "leech websites" that provide users hyperlinks to download torrent files of pirated materials, pasting hyperlinks of illegal websites on an anonymous message board, or providing "leech apps" for similar purposes. The part on the expansion of penalties took effect on 1 January 2021, and the part on regulation of leech websites and apps took effect on 1 October 2021. The new legislation exempts "minor offenses" and "special instances" (such as unintentional instances in screenshots, parodies and derivative works, and other small instances, such as downloading only a few frames from a comic book of several dozen pages, or a couple of pages from a novel containing several hundred pages) from being categorized as illicit due to concerns it would clash with the right to freedom of speech. Penalties for operating or establishing leech sites will be set at up to five years in jail or a maximum fine of 5 million yen. The law focuses mainly on content downloaded to devices, so a loophole may exist in terms of livestreaming such content.

Unlike most other countries, filesharing copyrighted content is not just a civil offense, but a criminal one, with penalties of up to ten years for uploading and penalties of up to two years for downloading. There is also a high level of Internet service provider cooperation. This may be one of the reasons that anonymous networks such as Winny, Perfect Dark and Share are thought to be popular compared to public networks such as BitTorrent, WinMX, Gnutella (Cabos) and OpenNap (Utatane).

== History ==
=== 2000 ===
Kevin Hearn and Frontcode Technologies release WinMX, one of the first peer-to-peer file sharing clients to provide Unicode support for Japanese characters.

=== 2002 ===
The Recording Industry Association of Japan releases its first report on file sharing. 84% of those who had used file sharing software reported using WinMX mainly to share J-pop mp3's. About half of these people had used Napster in the past, but its use was dropping off. Isamu Kaneko of Tokyo University releases Winny, the first Japanese file sharing client, based on the anonymous P2P, distributed data store and node model of Freenet.

=== 2003 ===
'#Rufu' releases Utatane, a Japanese client for connecting to the OpenNap network. August 8, the Antinny virus is first reported. Users of Winny unknowingly install it on their computers, and then the virus uses Winny to upload their personal information to the network.

=== 2004 ===
On May 10, Isamu Kaneko is arrested on suspicion of encouraging copyright infringement through his posts to 2channel regarding Winny. Fairu Souko (ファイル倉庫 File warehouse) releases Share, based on Winny, but making it easier to find files. Cabos is also released, a Japanese client for connecting to the Gnutella network.

=== 2005 ===
February 14, Chad Hurley, Steve Chen and Jawed Karim found YouTube, an American video sharing site, that becomes popular in Japan and around the world. The website Nyaa Torrents comes online providing links to torrents for Japanese anime and other East Asian files.

=== 2006 ===
Kaicho (会長, association president) releases Perfect Dark, a further development in the Winny/Share line. The Kyoto court finds Kaneko guilty, and requires that he pay a 1.5 million yen fine. He files an appeal the same day. December 12, Nobuo Kawakami founds Niconico, a Japanese video sharing site, initially relying heavily on YouTube content.

=== 2007 ===
On the RIAJ survey, Japanese users indicated Winny and Limewire as more popular than WinMX for the first time. The RIAJ's node count shows Winny having 264 000 people connected followed by Share with 201 000. In March, the company Retina released Sharebot, a program designed to detect the IP address of users of Share who are uploading files. Developers respond by releasing DiffusionProClone, a Share plugin designed to block all instances of Sharebot from connecting to a user's Share.

=== 2008 ===
The RIAJ's node count has Share rising to 209 000 connections, and Winny falling to 181 000. U.S.-based Japanese language web host Fc2.com introduces a video sharing service similar to YouTube. Kazushi Hirata is arrested, and found guilty receiving a 2-year jail sentence suspended for 3 years for uploading a pre-release movie to Winny.

=== 2009 ===
In 2009 the copyright law was amended to specifically single out the uploading of copyrighted material for special penalties of up to ten years in prison. October 8, the Osaka High Court finds Kaneko not guilty. The prosecutors appeal the verdict to the Supreme Court.

=== 2010 ===
In 2010 the copyright law was amended to criminalize downloading copyrighted material. The Japanese press reported the first incident of a man being arrested for uploading a TV program he'd recorded to BitTorrent.

=== 2011 ===
December 20, the Supreme Court finds Kaneko not guilty.

=== 2012 ===
The criminal penalties for downloading material were strengthened. The maximum penalty was set as 2 years in prison and a two million yen fine.

=== 2013 ===
Palo Alto Networks published a report estimating that BitTorrent consumed the most bandwidth in Japan (6.5 trillion bits) followed by Perfect Dark (1.8 trillion) and Share (1.06 trillion) with Winny, Gnutella and WinMX further behind. NHK reports 24 people being arrested for uploading anime to Share, 2 arrested for uploading to Perfect Dark and one arrested for uploading to an unnamed file host.

=== 2014 ===
Japan's Association for Copyright of Computer Software reported that overall use of file sharing had dropped markedly since 2008 with Share still the most popular file sharing program with 44 000 nodes, followed by Perfect Dark(24 000) and Winny (12 000). Netagent also noted a decline, but had Winny with 51 000 nodes, Perfect Dark with 49 000, and Share with 39 000.

=== 2016 ===
Japan's National Police Agency reports arresting 44 people for copyright infringement carried out through the use of file sharing software. The announcement notes that downloading is now illegal in Japan.

=== 2018 ===
Netagent reported a further decline with Winny having the largest number of nodes 45 000 followed by Perfect Dark with 30 000 followed by Share with 10 000.

=== 2019 ===
A Korean man living in Japan is arrested for uploading an anime that was available for free on YouTube to the BitTorrent network.

=== 2022 ===
Content Overseas Distribution Association (CODA) estimated damage from pirated Japanese content distributed online had reached ¥2 trillion.

== See also ==
- Legal aspects of file sharing
- Perfect Dark
- Share
- WinMX
- Winny
