= Fondren (name) =

Fondren is both a given name and surname. Notable people with the name include:

- Fondren Mitchell (1921–1952), American football player
- Debra Jo Fondren (born 1955), American model
- Ella Florence Fondren (1880–1982), American philanthropist
- Fred Fondren (1948–1992), American actor
- Larry Fondren, American entrepreneur
- Walter Fondren (1936–2010), American football player
- Walter Fondren Sr. (1877–1939), American oil industry businessman
