= Pycassa =

pycassa is a client library for Apache Cassandra.

It is a Python client library having following features:

- Auto-failover for normal or thread-local connections
- Batch interface
- Connection pooling
- Method to map an existing class to a Cassandra column family

Like Apache Cassandra, pycassa is open-source.

== Code example ==
The following code adds the user name with the corresponding password to the column families (pycassa.ColumnFamily) USER and USERNAME:

username = "jericevans"
password = "**********"
useruuid = str(uuid())
columns = {"id": useruuid, "username": username, "password": password}
USER.insert(useruuid, columns)
USERNAME.insert(username, {"id": useruuid})
