= Key space =

The word key space (or keyspace) is used in

- Key space (cryptography) for an algorithm refers to the set of all possible keys that can be used to initialize it
- Keyspace (distributed data store), an object in NoSQL data stores that can be seen as a schema in RDBMS databases
