= Dundalk Grammar School =

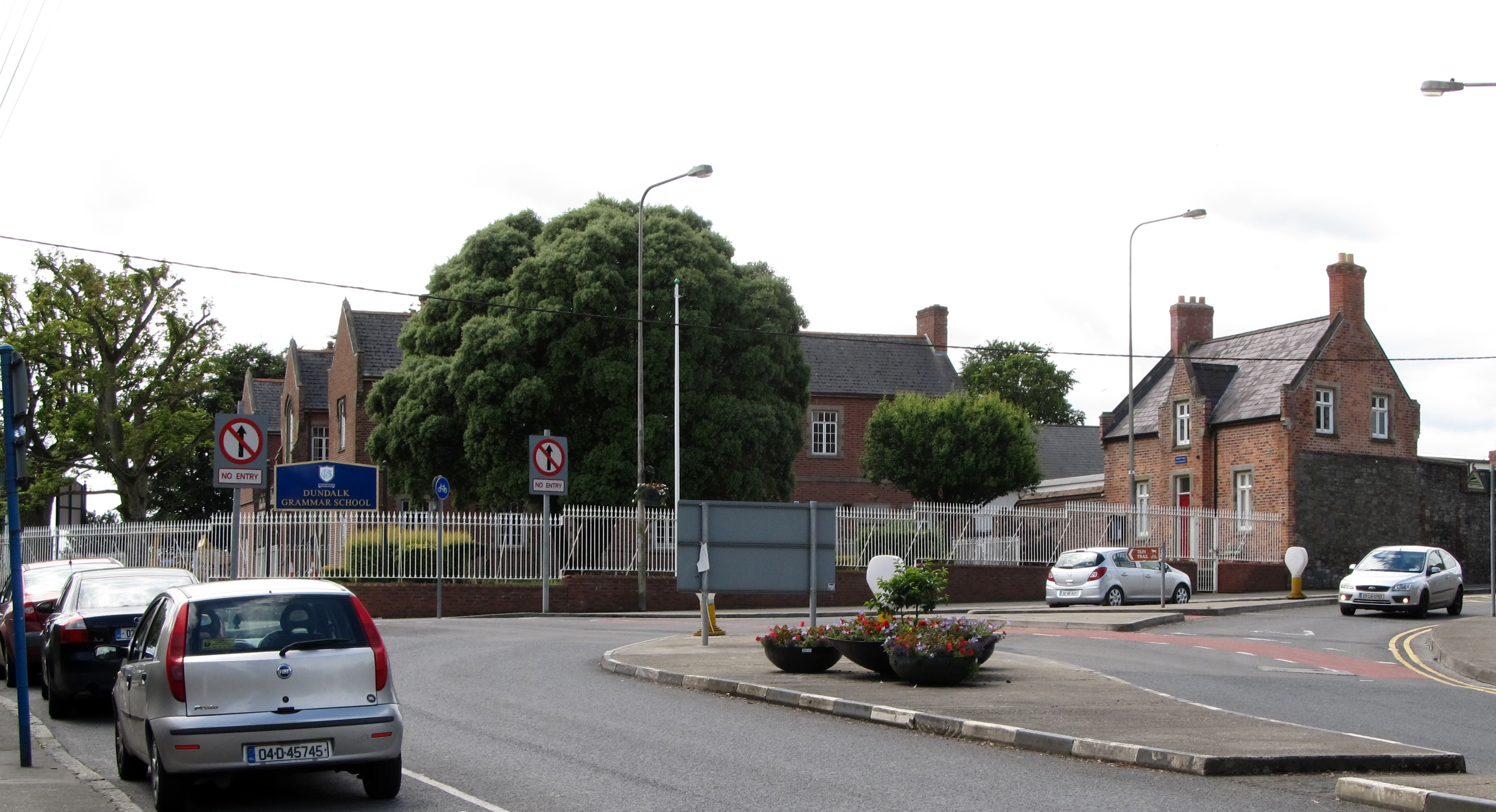
- Dundalk Grammar School, Ardee Road, Dundalk

Location
- Dundalk, Louth; Ireland
- Coordinates: 53°59′51″N 6°24′37″W

Information
- Type: Primary, secondary and boarding School
- Motto: Sapere Aude (dare to know)
- Religious affiliation: Multi-denominational (traditionally Church of Ireland)
- Established: 1739; 287 years ago
- Local authority: ISHA
- Headmaster: Jonathan Graham
- Gender: Mixed
- Age: 4 to 19
- Enrollment: 574 (2024)
- Colours: White, Navy & Blue
- Sports: Rugby, hockey, soccer, athletics, basketball, tennis
- Website: www.dgs.ie

Dundalk Grammar School, is an independent school in Dundalk, County Louth, Ireland. The school is co-educational with both primary and secondary departments. It is one of a small number of schools in Ireland offering students an education from school entry (4 years) until school leaving age (18–19 years). The Junior school offers an 8-year primary programme. Most students enter the secondary school at 12 years old and complete a six-year cycle where Junior Certificate, Transition Year, and Leaving Certificate programs are completed. As of 2024, the secondary school had an enrollment of 574.

== Background ==
Dundalk Grammar School was founded in 1739 as a charter school by the Incorporated Society for Promoting Protestant Schools in Ireland. It was reorganised in 1835, largely by the Rev. Elias Thackeray, as the Dundalk Educational Institution. The school, which did not operate during World War I, was revived in 1921 by a local committee and reconstituted as Dundalk Grammar School. This committee was later enlarged and became the board of governors. The board of governors is assisted by the school's board of management, which includes representatives from school staff and parents.

The school has its roots in the Church of Ireland (Anglican) tradition and now operates under a management body which reflects its Protestant ethos. The school body is multi-denominational. As of 2024, there were over 570 pupils at secondary level. Of these, approximately 100 are members of the boarding department - which offers weekly boarding for students from 11–18 years.

== Extracurricular activities ==
The main sports at the school include rugby, hockey and soccer while other sports (including badminton, cricket, basketball and Gaelic football) are also played. Other extracurricular activities, undertaken at the school, include music, drama and debating.

== Notable past pupils ==
- Richard Best, politician; Attorney General (NI)
- Gordon Morgan Holmes, neurologist
- Leslie Alexander Montgomery, author (under pseudonym Lynn C. Doyle)
- Lieutenant James Samuel Emerson - Victoria Cross (France 1917)
- Lieutenant William David Kenny - Victoria Cross (India 1920)
- Ian Clarke, computer scientist
- Nigel Cox, artist
- Colin O'Donoghue, actor
- John McGahon, Fine Gael Senator
