= Ian Clarke (computer scientist) =

Irish computer scientist

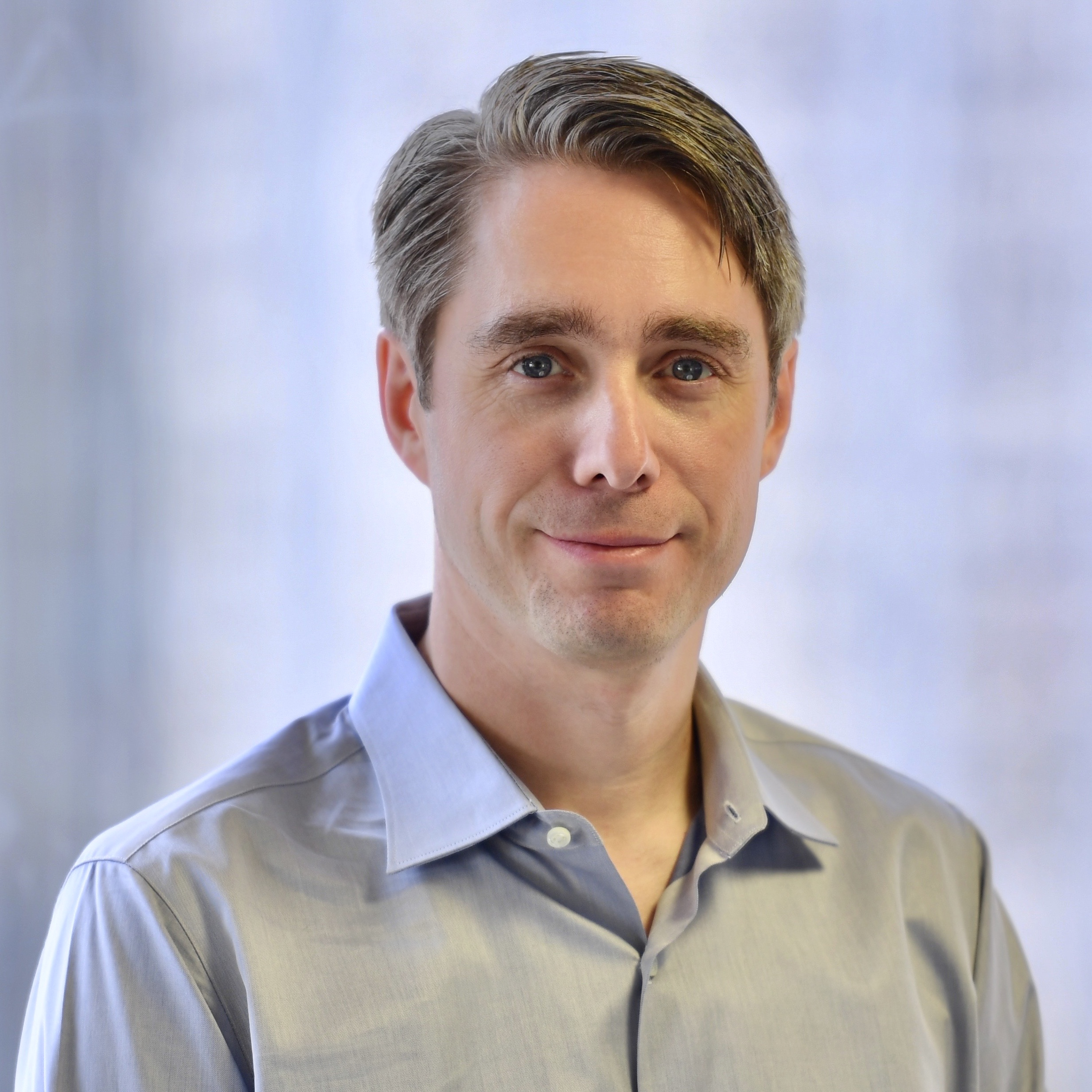
- Ian Clarke in October 2019
- Born: 16 February 1977 (age 49); Navan, Ireland
- Citizenship: Ireland, United States
- Education: University of Edinburgh, Scotland
- Known for: Freenet peer to peer software, Revver
- Awards: 2003 Technology Review Young Innovator
- Scientific career
- Fields: Computer science, artificial intelligence

Ian Clarke (born 16 February 1977) is the original designer and lead developer of Hyphanet.

== Early life ==
Clarke grew up in Navan, County Meath, Ireland. He was educated at Dundalk Grammar School and while there, he came first twice in the Senior Chemical, Physical, and Mathematical section of the Young Scientist Exhibition. The first time, in 1993, was with a project entitled "The C Neural Network Construction Kit". The second time, the following year, was with a project entitled "Mapping Internal Variations in Translucency within a Translucent Object using Beams of Light".

== Freenet ==
In 1995, Clarke left Dundalk to study Computer Science and Artificial Intelligence at the University of Edinburgh, Scotland. While at Edinburgh, he became president of the then dormant Artificial Intelligence Society, resulting in its revival. In Clarke's final year at Edinburgh, he completed his final year project, entitled "A Distributed, Decentralised Information Storage and Retrieval System". In July 1999, after receiving a 'B' grade for his paper, he decided to release it to the Internet and invited volunteers to help implement his design. The resulting free software project became known as Freenet, and attracted significant attention from the mainstream and technology media.

In August 1999, Clarke began his first full-time job as a software developer in the Space Division of Logica plc, a London-based software consulting company. In February 2000, he left Logica to join a small software start-up called Instil Ltd. In August 2000, he left London for Santa Monica, California, where he co-founded Uprizer, Inc. with the intent of commercializing some of his Freenet-related ideas. In January 2001, Uprizer Inc. successfully raised $4 million in Series A round venture funding from investors including Intel Capital.

In March 2001, Clarke published an article describing FairShare, developed in collaboration with Uprizer's co-founders, Steven Starr and Rob Kramer. Clarke was concerned that copyright would become increasingly difficult to enforce in the Internet age, the goal of Fairshare was to provide an alternative to copyright as a way to compensate creators.

== Professional career ==
In September 2002, after leaving Uprizer, Clarke formed Cematics LLC to explore a variety of new ideas and opportunities. Cematics LLC developed a number of products including Locutus - a P2P search application for the enterprise, WhittleBit - a search engine that learns from user feedback, and 3D17, a web-based collaborative editing tool.

In October 2003, Clarke decided to leave the United States to return to Edinburgh, Scotland. In December 2004, he began work on Dijjer, a distributed P2P web cache, and Indy, a collaborative music discovery system, both in conjunction with ChangeTv, a company founded by his long-time collaborator, Steven Starr, who later brought in Clarke and Oliver Luckett as co-founders. In 2003, he was named to the MIT Technology Review TR100 as one of the top 100 innovators in the world under the age of 35.

ChangeTv changed its name to Revver Inc. and unveiled a new website in November 2005 that strove to let creators of short videos earn revenue from their work. Revver was one of several user-created video websites unveiled in late 2005, but was the first such website to financially compensate video creators, and is reminiscent of Fairshare.

In December 2006, Clarke left Revver and moved to Austin, Texas. There, Clarke founded a new company, SenseArray, which is a drop-in ad targeting engine based on a proprietary algorithm developed by Clarke. In October 2009, he released Swarm, a novel approach to distributing computation across multiple computers in a manner largely transparent to the programmer.

In January 2012, Clarke co-founded OneSpot, with the goal of creating "ads that don't suck". Over the next 3 years, he designed a real-time bidding engine capable of consistently outperforming Google Adwords. In March 2012, he open sourced LastCalc, an online calculator he intended to provide an open and more flexible alternative to tools like Google Calculator.
