= Steven Starr =

American film producer

Steven Starr (born 1957) is the producer of FLOW: For Love Of Water, and the founder of Revver.

== Background ==
Steven Starr was born on Long Island. Starr started in high school as a volunteer journalist at WLIR in New York, pursued a degree in radio, TV and Film at the University of Wisconsin–Madison, and worked his way through college as a campus journalist, DJ, CBS Records college rep, and concert promoter for Bob Marley & The Wailers.

== Career ==
After starting in the mail room in 1980, Starr launched the William Morris Agency new media division, packaged TV series and screenplays, then headed the New York Motion Picture department under Sue Mengers. His clients over the years included Larry David, Ang Lee, Andy Warhol, Ziggy Marley, Sandra Bernhard, Andy Grove, Joseph Papp, Reinaldo Povod, William Kunstler, Tim Robbins, and Kids In The Hall.

Starr left Morris in 1991 to produce Johnny Suede, winner of the Golden Leopard at the Locarno International Film Festival, then write, direct and produce Joey Breaker, winner of the Audience Award at the Santa Barbara International Film Festival. He then co-created and produced Ace Award nominee The State for MTV and CBS, and collaborated with the Marley family on a variety of estate projects, including a Bob Marley biopic.

Starr went on to focus full-time on media democratization in 1999, as a co-founder of the Los Angeles Independent Media Center, and founder/CEO of AntEye.com, a user-generated video site where video creators, voted on by their peers, were awarded micro-pilot budgets in various categories. Despite thousands of submissions and a first-look partnership with HBO, bandwidth costs were prohibitive, and by mid-2000 AntEye became unsustainable.

Starr then co-founded Uprizer with Freenet Project founder Ian Clarke and Rob Kramer. Funded by Intel, Uprizer developed a zero-cost, peer-to-peer bandwidth solution for independent creators. After Hummer Winblad was named in the Napster lawsuits, Uprizer re-oriented as an enterprise software solution, Starr and Clarke departed to continue work on Freenet, and Uprizer sold to Redux Holdings.

After the Pacifica Foundation approached Starr to reorganize KPFK, the largest progressive radio signal in the US, he went on to develop ChangeTv in collaboration with John Perry Barlow and Amnesty International ED Jack Healy, a user-generated digital cable network designed to filter online video onto cable and reward creators.

== Revver ==
When financing proved difficult, Starr launched Revver to focus on rewarding online video creators in direct proportion to virality, bringing on Ian Clarke, Andrew Clarke, then Oliver Luckett and Downhill Battle. The Revver beta launched on October 29, 2005. Revver split advertising revenue 50/50 with creators, gave 20% of advertising revenue to syndicators, and enabled content redistribution under the Attribution-NonCommercial-NoDerivs 2.5 Creative Commons License.

In 2006, Revver was awarded the Most Influential Independent Website by Television Week, nominated for an Advanced Technology Emmy Award, and honored as one of the 100 most promising startups by Red Herring. Revver's creator economy business model forced many sites to begin offering revenue share to creators, including YouTube, and in 2007, Revver announced it had paid out its first million dollars to online creators. In February 2008, Revver was sold to LiveUniverse, which abandoned the creator/syndicator revshare model, starting a precipitous decline in users.

== FLOW: For Love Of Water ==
Starr went on to finalize production of Irena Salina's feature-length global water crisis documentary FLOW: For Love Of Water, and launch a Right To Water campaign to add a 31st article to the Universal Declaration Of Human Rights, Article31.org. FLOW premiered as a Grand Jury Prize nominee at the 2008 Sundance Film Festival Competition, and went on to win a variety of festival awards, including the International Jury Prize at the Mumbai International Film Festival and the Grand Jury Award for Best Documentary at the United Nations Film Festival. FLOW was released theatrically by Oscilloscope Labs in Sept. 2008, and served as an activist tool for the global Right To Water movement.

FLOW was invited to screen for the UN General Assembly on the 60th Anniversary of the signing of the Universal Declaration of Human Rights, where the first 50,000 signatories to Article31 were presented to the President of the General Assembly, Father Miguel D'Escoto Brockmann. On July 28, 2010, a resolution presented by Bolivia and co-sponsored by 35 countries, called on the General Assembly to recognize the Right To Water. Despite opposition from the U.S., the U.K. and their allies, the resolution passed with the support of 122 countries, representing over 5 billion people. In 2010, a French court rejected a defamation lawsuit against FLOW brought by Suez Environnement, one of the largest water companies in the world. In 2012, Suez lost on appeal and was forced by the court to pay the filmmakers both legal fees and damages.

== The Garden ==
Starr then executive produced and organized theatrical distribution for the Academy Award-nominated, urban farming documentary The Garden.

== CitizenGlobal ==
Starr joined CitizenGlobal to build a media co-creation platform with a team including Ward Cunningham, developer of the first wiki, organizing social initiatives for Occupy Wall Street, XPrize, Sierra Club, 350.org, Univision, Sesame Street, Congo Woman's Relief, and others.

== Spotlight Expose ==
After going back to school for a Master's in Spiritual Psychology, Starr broke a lifelong silence to share childhood experiences at The Fessenden School as the lead of a 2016 Boston Globe Spotlight expose on sexual abuse at 67 boarding schools with hundreds of victims.

== Extinction Rebellion ==
Starr then co-founded XRLA, the Los Angeles Chapter of Extinction Rebellion, a global environmental movement using nonviolent civil disobedience to compel government action to avoid tipping points in the climate system, biodiversity loss, and the risk of social and ecological collapse.

== NooWorld ==
Starr then launched the climate solidarity network Noo.World as part of the 80x25 Coalition to protect 80% of the Amazon Rainforest by 2025.

== Freenet ==
Starr currently works on Freenet, the peer-to-peer decentralization project created by Ian Clarke. Starr and Clarke co-founded the Freenet Project nonprofit in 2001, and in 2026 introduced the current generation of Freenet, a ground-up redesign intended to support decentralized applications, communication, collaboration, and commerce over a peer-to-peer network.
