= SkeedCast =

SkeedCast is a P2P video streaming browser plug-in by Dreamboat, released in October 2006. Winny developer Isamu Kaneko has also cooperated in development. The software is also provided by Internet Initiative Japan (IIJ).

== Uses ==
- ABC Dōga Club by Asahi Broadcasting Corporation
- Official website for the anime Kara no Kyōkai.
