= Fondren =

Fondren may refer to:

- Fondren Library, main library of Rice University
- Fondren Southwest, Houston
- Fondren (name)
- Fondren, a suburb of Jackson, Mississippi where the Lorena Duling School was built
