= Share (P2P) =

Peer-to-peer application

- Developer: ファイル倉庫 (Fairu Souko "File warehouse")
- Initial release: 2004
- Operating system: Microsoft Windows
- Type: File sharing
- License: Freeware
- Website: Only on Freenet

Share (シャレ(洒落),シェア) is the name for a closed-source P2P application being developed in Japan by ファイル倉庫, a pseudonym translating as 'file warehouse.' Share was developed to be the successor to Winny. Like Winny, Share functions using a distributed data store referred to as a cache with each computer acting as a node in the network. Netagent published a survey in June 2018 suggesting that Share was the third most popular p2p network in Japan after Winny and Perfect Dark (P2P) with approximately 10,000 nodes connecting each day over Golden Week, down from 30,000 in 2015.

== Background ==
Share's logo refers to the Laughing Man, which is a fictional character from the anime series Ghost in the Shell: Stand Alone Complex, as an anonymous hacker.

Share uses encryption to hide the identity of who is transferring or what they are transferring. It is non-centralized so it cannot be easily shut down and it supports multiple source "swarm" downloading. All files are transferred encrypted so they must be decrypted upon download completion. In the meantime they are stored in encrypted form in a "Cache" folder. This folder is also used to allow recently downloaded files to be shared among the network based on priorities.

Share also features a plugin system. The plugins and PDK are readily available through the Share network. The PDK is written in Delphi.

Unlike Winny, Share allows users to specify up to 255 Cluster Keywords, though only 5 can be active at once (Winny only allowed 3 cluster words, and its system was more confusing). These are used to connect to nodes that have also specified the same Cluster Keywords. This allows users to maintain connections with nodes that are sharing files they might be interested in, while disconnecting from nodes that share content they are not concerned about.

Users can specify auto-download triggers and auto-block filters. The network also appears to have some sort of a "forgery warning" system to warn people about possible falsified data/files.

Like Winny, Share uses « Trip IDs » to verify the identity of a person sharing a file. A « Trip ID » is a sort of encrypted key that identifies a person who they say they are. This allows users to decide whether or not they trust a person based on their previous sharing experience with them.

When a new version of Share becomes available, users are given a notice in the Share statusbar. When this happens, users can search for the new version on the Share network, and download it from a reliable source based on Trip.

== Criticism ==
Share is highly popular in Japan, but in the West, some concerns have been raised.

- In Japan, high speed Internet is more readily available than in most of Western Europe and North America. For this reason the minimum upload and download limits are set to 50 kB/s. Also, the cache system can use around 4 GB of free space at any given time to store cached downloads. This might be inconvenient for people with small hard drives.
- As a closed source product, Share partially relies on security through obscurity.
- Like many other P2P applications, Share downloads files in blocks. However, Share can only export partially downloaded files in sequential manner. For example, if a file has 100 blocks and block 51 is missing, Share will not be able to export block 52-100 even if they are already downloaded. Plugin developers have tried to overcome this limitation.

== Download ==
Share can be downloaded from the Share P2P and P2P ファイル共有ソフトノード登録所 websites.

== Language localizations ==
Unlike Winny, Share includes an option for language localisation changes (labeling of buttons, etc.). The locale.txt file contains the information for a particular language and resides in the Share directory.

- An English localization for A82
- An English localization for EX2 (TCP version)
- An English localization for NT5 (UDP version)
- More English localizations for Locate/Hint/Readme/Info
- Spanish localization for EX2

== Legal issues ==
On 9 May 2008, three Japanese people aged 21 to 41 were arrested in Kyoto, Japan for illegally uploading copyrighted files with Share. These were the first Share-related cases in Japan. Nevertheless, a research showed that there was no significant drop of on-line Share users after these arrests.

On 27 November 2008, another male Share user was arrested in Japan for illegally uploading Japanese TV drama with Share.

On 12 February 2009, two male Share users became the first to be arrested on charges of uploading Child pornography with Share.

On 30 September 2009, multiple Japanese media reported that two men were arrested for uploading Nintendo DS game software which include Square Enix's Dragon Quest IX. They are the first users arrested for uploading DS games.

On 30 November 2009, 10 Japanese men and 1 woman were arrested for sharing anime, music, movies, and games. Not all were the original uploaders.

On 31 March 2010, 62-year-old Seiji Sato was spotted by a new p2p surveillance software for sharing Avatar and other movies.

On 14 January 2011, 18 people were arrested for sharing movies, anime, music, games and software.

== See also ==
- Anonymous P2P
- File sharing in Japan
- Perfect Dark (P2P)
- WinMX
- Winny
