= Joey Breaker =

- Directed by: Steven Starr
- Written by: Steven Starr
- Produced by: Amos Poe; Steven Starr; Dolly Hall
- Starring: Richard Edson; Cedella Marley; Philip Seymour Hoffman; Fred Fondren; Erik King
- Cinematography: Joe DeSalvo
- Edited by: Michael Schweitzer
- Music by: Paul Aston
- Production company: Starr Productions
- Distributed by: Skouras Pictures
- Release date: March 5, 1993
- Running time: 92 minutes
- Country: United States
- Language: English

Joey Breaker is a 1993 American romance film starring Richard Edson and Cedella Marley. Philip Seymour Hoffman and Erik King also appear in the film. The film contains some autobiographical elements of its writer and director, Steven Starr.

== Plot ==
Joey Breaker is a successful talent agent who misses purpose in life. This changes gradually after he meets waitress and student nurse Cyan Worthington from Jamaica. Eventually, he quits his job and follows his heart to Jamaica where Cyan serves the population of her native district as a nurse with an independent practice.

== Cast ==
- Richard Edson as Joey Breaker
- Olga Bagnasco as Karina Danzi
- George Bartenieff as Dean Milford
- Sam Coppola as Sid Kramer
- John Costelloe as Randy Jeter
- Fred Fondren as Alfred Moore
- Gina Gershon as Jenny Chaser
- Seth Gilliam as Jeremy Brasher
- Lewis Black as Pete Grimm
- Philip Seymour Hoffman as Wiley McCall
- Michael Imperioli as Larry Metz
- Mary Joy as Esther Trigliani
- Erik King as Hip Hop Hank
- Cedella Marley as Cyan Worthington
- Laurence Mason as Lester White
- Parker Posey as Irene Kildare
- Sunday Theodore as Morissa Marker

== Reception ==
=== Awards ===
- 1993 - Audience Choice Award for Best Film at the Santa Barbara International Film Festival.
