= Super column =

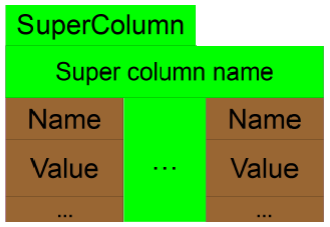
The super column consists of a (unique) super column name, and a number of columns.

A super column is a tuple (a pair) with a binary super column name and a value that maps it to many columns. They consist of a key–value pairs, where the values are columns. Theoretically speaking, super columns are (sorted) associative array of columns. Similar to a regular column family where a row is a sorted map of column names and column values, a row in a super column family is a sorted map of super column names that maps to column names and column values.

A super column is part of a keyspace together with other super columns and column families, and columns.

== Code example ==
Written in the JSON-like syntax, a super column definition can be like this:

{
  "databases": {
    "Cassandra": {
      "age": 20,
      "name": {
        "firstName": "Cassandra",
        "lastName": "apache"
      }
    },
    "HBase": {
      "age": 20,
      "address": {
        "city": "Seoul",
        "postcode": "1234"
      }
    }
  }
}

Where:

"databases" are keyspace;

"Cassandra" and "HBase" are rowKeys;

"name" and "address" are super column names;

"firstName", "city", "age", etc. are column names.

== See also ==
- Column (data store)
- Keyspace (distributed data store)
- Super column family
