= Revver =

Former video hosting website

- Formerly: ChangeTv
- Founded: May 5, 2005
- Defunct: August 20, 2011 (6 years, 3 months and 15 days)
- Fate: Shut down
- Headquarters: New York City, New York, U.S.
- Area served: Worldwide
- Website: www.revver.com

Revver (originally known as ChangeTv) was an American video sharing website that hosted user-generated content. Until its shutdown in 2011, Revver attached advertising to user-submitted video clips and originally offered to share ad revenue with the video creators. Videos could be displayed, downloaded, and shared across the web in either Apple QuickTime or FLV format. Revver allowed developers to create a complete white label of the Revver platform.

== History ==
Revver was founded by Steven Starr, Ian Clarke, and Oliver Luckett in 2004, and was based in Los Angeles. The website launched on October 29, 2005, and received investment from Bessemer Venture Partners, Draper Fisher Jurvetson, Draper Richards, William R. Hearst, III, Comcast Interactive Capital, and Turner Broadcasting. Oliver Luckett and Ian Clarke departed the company in late 2006, while Steven Starr stepped down as CEO in 2007.

In September 2006, a new design was introduced, along with a user dashboard, a web-based uploader, and Flash as a video delivery method. Around the same time as the release, prominent YouTube user lonelygirl15 signed a promotional deal with Revver. After this relaunch, Revver's video count went from 20,000 to 100,000 videos. The site's most popular user, a creator of videos mixing Mentos into Coke, had generated a payment to its creators of US$50,000. In November 2006, Verizon Wireless and Revver announced a deal to make Revver videos available to subscribers of Verizon's V CAST service. Through this deal, Revver videos did not contain advertisements at the end, but Revver shared half of the revenue from the venture with content creators.

Revver was acquired by LiveUniverse for US$5 million in February 2008. LiveUniverse stopped making regular payments of shared ad revenue to video creators several months after the acquisition. Since August 20, 2011, for unknown reasons, Revver shut its doors.

== Revenue model ==
Revver was the first video-sharing website to monetize user-generated content through advertising and to share ad revenue with the creator.

In 2006, Revver was awarded the Most Influential Independent Website by Television Week, nominated for an Advanced Technology Emmy Award, and honored as one of the 100 most promising startups by Red Herring. In 2007, Revver announced it had paid out its first million dollars to online creators and syndicators.

The defining feature behind Revver was the RevTag, a tracking tag attached to uploaded videos. The RevTag displayed an advertisement at the end of each video. When clicked, the advertiser was charged and the advertising fee was split between the video creator and Revver. RevTags were trackable across the web; because the RevTag was part of the video file itself, the technology worked regardless of where the video file is hosted or displayed. Users were further encouraged to share by Revver's affiliate program. An Affiliate was a user who helped to promote videos, through email, sneakernet, peer-to-peer sharing, or posting on their own website or on social networking sites. Revver affiliates earned 20% of ad revenue for sharing videos. The remaining revenue for each video is divided equally between the video creator and Revver.

Revver's upload license allows for redistribution under the Attribution-NonCommercial-NoDerivs 2.5 Creative Commons License.

== Criticism ==
In February 2008, Revver was sold to LiveUniverse, which abandoned the creator/syndicator revshare model, starting a precipitous decline in users. On December 9, 2008, Revver sent a message to all its users saying that earnings from June were transferred, and the other earnings would be transferred 'as soon as possible'. But several of Revver's most popular content providers including ScrewAttack and That Guy with the Glasses publicly posted complaints of LiveUniverse owing them vast amounts of money on their websites and began moving their content over to blip.tv. To date, neither company has been paid. Many public complaints appeared in the Revver forums indicating that LiveUniverse would not respond to inquiries.

In 2010, the State of California listed the status of LiveUniverse as "Suspended."

== See also ==
- Viral video
- Comparison of video services
- Web 2.0
- Metacafe
- Break.com
