= Irish Charter Schools =

18th century Irish Protestant charity school board

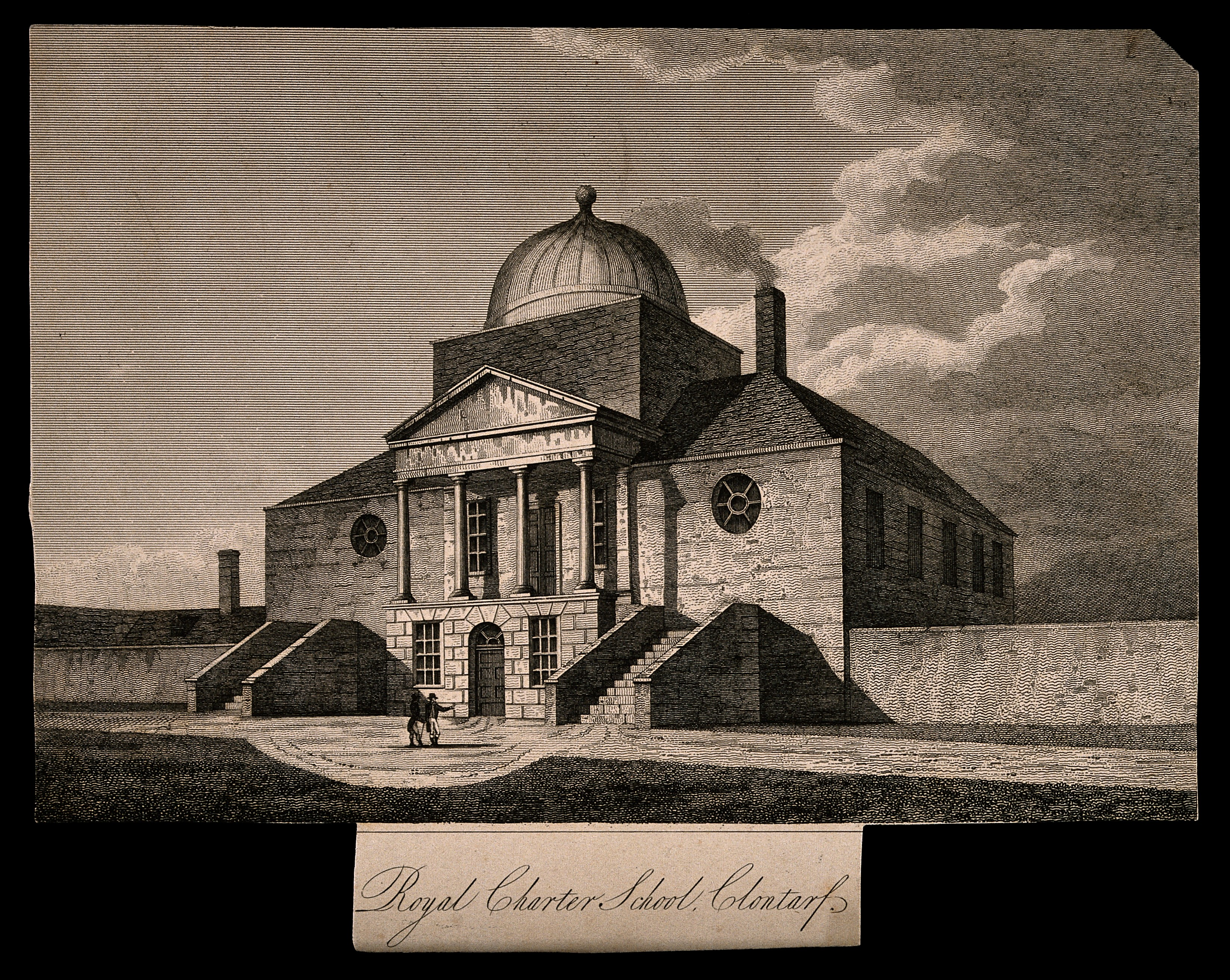
Royal Charter School, Clontarf, Dublin

Irish Charter Schools were operated by The Incorporated Society in Dublin for Promoting English Protestant Schools in Ireland. The Charter Schools admitted only Catholics, under the condition that they be educated as Protestants. These schools were intended, in the words of their programme, "to rescue the souls of thousands of poor children from the dangers of Popish superstition and idolatry, and their bodies from the miseries of idleness and beggary."

== History ==
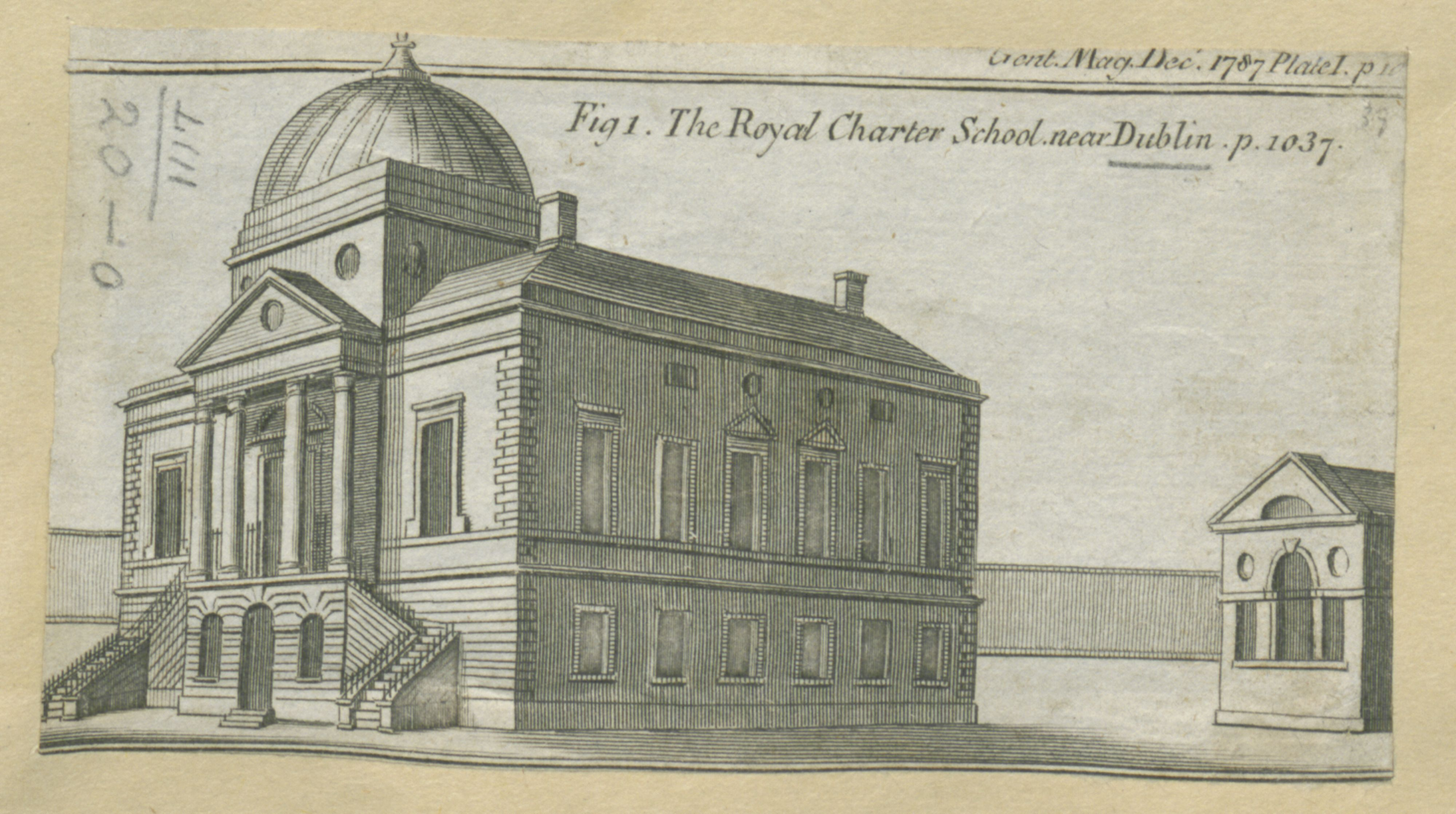
Side view of the Royal Charter School, Clontarf

In 1731 Hugh Boulter, Primate of Armagh, submitted the findings of the Inquiry into Illegal Popish Schools by the House of Lords, which was set up "to prevent the growth of Popery, and to secure this Kingdom from any dangers from the great Number of Papists in this Nation." He advocated a school system "to teach the children of the papists the English tongue, and the principles of the Christian religion", as long as they converted to Protestantism. The same year, the archbishops and bishops of the Established Church in Ireland, among others, petitioned George II for a charter to set up schools where the children of Irish Catholics would be given free instruction in the English language and the Protestant religion. Boys would learn a trade and girls domestic skills, and maybe even be given a marriage portion, assuming they remained Protestant. At this time the Penal Laws were in full force: the Catholic clergy was outlawed, and no Catholic was permitted "publicly or in private houses teach school, or instruct youth in learning", so there was no source of education for Catholics. The charter was granted in 1733 and the king promised £1,000 per annum. The first school was opened at Castledermot on 20 acres (81,000 m^{2}) of land donated by the Earl of Kildare.

Over the following decades further finance was provided by the British government. The school system was overseen by a Committee of Fifteen who met weekly in Suffolk St. in Dublin. However, the numbers attending fell far short of expectations, despite various stratagems resorted to keep up the intake of children, such as taking beggar children off the street and taking in orphan babies. In the 1780s large discrepancies between the numbers reported to be at the schools, and the actual number found there were found and reported by John Howard, FRS. At that time there were 41 schools and four nurseries in the system. The schools were viewed with the deepest suspicion by Catholics.

John Wesley visited the school at Ballinrobe in 1785, where he found children being kept in atrocious conditions. Inspections towards the end of the century showed massive abuse of the system, many children receiving little instruction but being used mainly as farm labourers or weavers and subject to squalid conditions, punishment and disease.

The reputations and population of the schools continued to decrease from the turn of the 19th century until they petered out around mid-century.

== Schools ==
- Castledermot: The first Charter School, established in 1734. It was bequeathed £500 by the 19th Earl of Kildare and endowed with twenty acres of land by the 20th Earl.
- Clontarf: This charter-school was opened by Lord Harrington in 1748. It was helped by donations and bequests, for example in 1759 A Mr. P. Ramsey donated the interest of £200 to the school, and in 1771 the Rev. John Johnson, Rector of Hollymount in County Mayo left £200 to the school. It was closed about 1830 and was converted to baths.
- Dundalk Grammar School: From 1739 to 1835 it was a Charter School.
- Santry: Located in present-day Ballymun, a charter-school was opened for sixty girls in 1744 in a converted mill and endowed with £50 per annum by the Dublin Corporation. The property developer Luke Gardiner donated an acre of land and a further 30 acres (120,000 m^{2}) at an economical rate for the use of the school. Hugh Boulter, Archbishop of Armagh, contributed £400 for the construction. A charter-school for 150 boys was also provided, with thirty-two acres of land, though it had few students. The school finally closed in 1840 and later became known as Santry Lodge.
- Ardbraccan: The charter-school here opened in 1747 and the building was designed by Richard Cassels.
