= Column family =

Database object that organizes data in packed columns

A column family is a database object that contains columns of related data. It is a tuple (pair) that consists of a key–value pair, where the key is mapped to a value that is a set of columns. In analogy with relational databases, a column family is as a "table", each key-value pair being a "row". Each column is a tuple (triplet) consisting of a column name, a value, and a timestamp. In a relational database table, this data would be grouped together within a table with other non-related data.

Two types of column families exist:

- Standard column family: contains only columns
- Super column family: contains a map of super columns

== See also ==
- Keyspace (NoSQL)
