= Fred Fondren =

American actor

Fred Fondren (May 16, 1948 – June 8, 1992) was an American actor. He played the role of Alfred Moore, a man dying from AIDS, in the 1993 film, Joey Breaker. Fondren died after the movie's completion and the movie is dedicated to him.

Fondren was born in Alabama. Also known affectionately as "Freddie", he enrolled at Chapel Hill, working towards a double major in psychology and chemistry, when he attended an intensive Shakespeare Workshop at the Royal Academy of Arts in London, changing his life's course. After his return, he worked closely with a company of friends, doing theatre wherever they could. Eventually he became disenchanted and, while complaining to a good friend, she told him to "open your own". He and his close friend Robert Stocking found a former motorcycle shop on East Fifth Street in New York City's East Village, built a small stage (9'x12'), christened it "Prometheus", and opened for business. He remained there for the rest of his life, producing numerous shows.
