= Nigel Cox (artist) =

Irish figurative painter

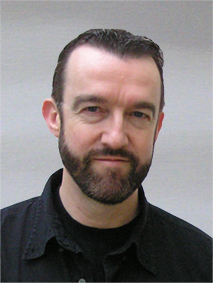
- Nigel Cox in 2012
- Born: Nigel Cox; Dundalk, Ireland
- Known for: Painting

Nigel Cox (born 1959) is an Irish figurative artist.

== Biography ==
=== Early life ===
Cox, the second youngest of four children, grew up in Dundalk, Ireland; he had three sisters, Sandra, Jacqui and Nicola. Cox left Ireland in 1977 to study marine radio and radar technology, at Riversdale College of Technology, Liverpool, UK in order to become a Radio Officer in the Merchant Navy. He then joined the Transglobe Expedition, led by Sir Ranulph Fiennes. This three-year expedition achieved the first circumnavigation of the globe on land, sea and ice via North and South poles along the Greenwich Meridian. In 1989 Cox moved to London.

=== Transglobe expedition ===
During the Transglobe Expedition, whose Patron was Prince Charles, Cox was at sea, on an ice cap or in a remote location, surrounded by the vast and desolate spaces which had a profound effect and influenced his art. During the expedition Cox's medium was sketchbook and watercolour.

== Work ==
=== Paintings and technique ===
Cox began painting in watercolour while on the Transglobe Expedition creating illustrations for his diary. He continued painting when living in Germany developing his technique in both watercolour and oils. In his work, Cox takes everyday people out of their busy surroundings and places them out of context, in minimalist empty landscapes. His techniques and influences are further explored in his interview in The Argus, by Margaret Roddy.

=== Exhibitions ===
2018 - Corey Helford Gallery, Los Angeles, California, Solo Exhibition, Solitude & The Road to Extinction

2018 - Galerie Hegemann, Munich, Germany, Contempo, Group Exhibition

2017 - Jonathan LeVine Gallery, New York, USA, The Shape of Things to Come, Group Exhibition

2016 - CONTEXT Art Miami, Miami, USA with Corey Helford Gallery

2016 - Corey Helford Gallery, Los Angeles, USA, Group Exhibition

2016 - Galerie Hegemann Gallery, Munich, Germany (Two man show with sculptor Michael Pickl)

2016 - Gormleys Fine Art, Dublin 2, Ireland, Far from the Crowd, Solo Show

2015 - Rarity Gallery, Mykonos, Greece, Group Exhibition

2014 - Oblivious, Coates & Scarry, Mayfair, London, U.K. Solo Show

2014 - Quantum Contemporary Art, Art Wynwood, Miami, Florida

2013 - Coates & Scarry, Philadelphia Street Gallery, Bristol, UK, Group Exhibition

2013 - Stroke Urban Art Fair, Coates & Scarry, Munich, Germany

2013 - Trailblazers, Above Second Gallery/Coates & Scarry, Hong Kong, Group Exhibition

2013 - Sanguine, Elisabeth Weinstock and Coates & Scarry, LA, California, Group Exhibition

2012 - Rarity Gallery Summer Salon Show, Mykonos, Greece, Group Exhibition

== Acknowledgments ==
=== Commissions & Awards ===
- London Lives 2010 competition - Silver Medal Awarded
- The Royal Society of Portrait Painters regularly selects Cox for their annual exhibitions at the Mall Galleries in London since 2007.
  - In 2010 his submission of "The Irrepressible Charlie Stock" is selected and reviewed by The Independent.
  - In 2012 his submission of commissioned portrait of "Carlos Acosta", is selected and reviewed by the Daily Telegraph and The Argus.

=== Contributions ===
- "Fagan's Fortune" by Nigel Cox was donated and auctioned for the Terrence Higgins Trust at The Lighthouse Gala Auction in March 2007 alongside Tracey Emin and Damien Hirst. This event held at Christie's annually raises funds for this charity, attracting London's fashion set.
