= Winny =

File-sharing software

- Developer: Isamu Kaneko (金子勇) 1971–2013
- Release: 2002; 24 years ago
- Written in: C++
- Operating system: Microsoft Windows
- Type: Anonymous P2P
- License: Closed source
- Website: web.archive.org/web/20030602161140/http://www.geocities.co.jp/SiliconValley/2949/

Winny (also known as WinNY) is a Japanese peer-to-peer (P2P) file-sharing program developed by Isamu Kaneko, a research assistant at the University of Tokyo in 2002. Like Freenet, a user must add an encrypted node list in order to connect to other nodes on the network. Users choose three cluster words which symbolize their interests, and then Winny connects to other nodes which share these cluster words, downloading and storing encrypted data from cache of these neighbors in a distributed data store. If users want a particular file, they set up triggers (keywords), and Winny will download files marked by these triggers. The encryption was meant to provide anonymity, but Winny also included bulletin boards where users would announce uploads, and the IP address of posters could be discovered through these boards. While Freenet was implemented in Java, Winny was implemented as a Windows C++ application.

The software takes its name from WinMX, where the M and the X are each advanced one letter in the Latin alphabet, to N and Y. Netagent published a survey in June 2018 suggesting that Winny was still the most popular p2p network in Japan ahead of Perfect Dark (P2P) and Share (P2P) with approximately 45,000 nodes connecting each day over Golden Week. The number of nodes on Winny appears to be holding steady compared with 2015.

Kaneko first announced Winny on the Download Software board of the 2channel (2ch for short) Japanese bulletin board site. Since 2channel users often refer to anonymous users by their post numbers, Kaneko came to be known as "Mr. 47" ("47-Shi", or 47氏 in Japanese), or just "47".

After Winny's development stopped, a new peer-to-peer application, Share, was developed to be a successor.

== Antinny ==
Since August 2003, several worms called "Antinny" have spread on the Winny network, copying itself to the Winny folder for file uploads with a fabricated name.

Some versions of Antinny work as follows:

- Upload files from the host computer onto the Winny network.
- Upload screenshots onto an image board.
- Denial-of-service attack to a copyright protecting agency web site.

Some people have uploaded their information unwittingly from their computers because of Antinny. That information includes governmental documents, information about customers, and people's private files. Once the information is uploaded, it is difficult to delete.

In 2005, All Nippon Airways suffered an embarrassing leak of passwords for security-access areas in 29 airports across Japan. A similar incident occurred with JAL Airlines on 17 December 2005, after a virus originating from Winny affected the computer of a co-pilot.

Following this, highly publicized cases of sensitive file uploading have come to light in Japan's media. In particular, a defense agency was forced to admit that classified information from the Maritime Self Defense Force was uploaded by a computer with Winny software installed on it.

Perhaps the largest Winny-related leak was that of the Okayama Prefectural Police Force, whose computer leaked the data of around 1,500 investigations. This information included sensitive data such as the names of sex crime victims, and is the largest amount of information held by Japanese police to have ever leaked online.

== Arrests and court cases ==
On November 28, 2003, two Japanese users of Winny, Yoshihiro Inoue, a 41-year-old self-employed businessman from Takasaki, Gunma Prefecture and an unemployed 19-year-old from Matsuyama, were arrested by the Kyoto Prefectural Police. They were accused of sharing copyrighted material via Winny and admitted to their crimes.

Shortly following the two users' arrests, Kaneko also had his home searched and had the source code of Winny confiscated by the Kyoto Police. On May 10, 2004, Kaneko was arrested for suspected conspiracy to encourage copyright infringement by the High-tech Crime Taskforce of the Kyoto Prefectural Police. Kaneko was released on bail on June 1, 2004. The court hearings started in September 2004 at Kyoto district court. On December 13, 2006, Kaneko was convicted of assisting copyright violations and sentenced to pay a fine of ¥1.5 million (about US$13,200). He appealed the ruling. On October 8, 2009, the guilty verdict was overturned by the Osaka High Court. On December 20, 2011, Kaneko was cleared of all charges after the Supreme Court of Japan agreed that the prosecution could not prove that he had any intention to promote the software for illegal use.

== In popular culture ==
Japanese heavy metal band, Maximum the Hormone referenced the software in their song "A-L-I-E-N" by satirically urging listeners to stop using the service in the lyrics.

== See also ==
- Anonymous P2P
- File sharing in Japan
- Perfect Dark
- Share
- WinMX
- Winny copyright infringement case
