= Larry Fondren =

American entrepreneur and inventor

Larry Eugene Fondren
- Born: Pennsylvania, United States
- Education: The American College of Financial Services
- Occupations: Entrepreneur, inventor, credit markets expert

Larry Eugene Fondren is an American entrepreneur, inventor and credit markets expert noted for his efforts to bring transparency and higher yields to the bond market and for improving access within financial markets.

In 1993 he launched an electronic financial facility called InterVest as a disruptive innovation to the exiting bond markets. Existing firms refused to participate which led to a Federal antitrust lawsuit and the ultimate failure of the venture. However the result of Fondren's efforts and expert witness testimony to the US Governments Subcommittee on Finance and Hazardous Materials resulted in the passing of The Bond Price Competition Improvement Act of 1999.

== Career ==
In 1987, Fondren started The Exchange, a confidential communication service of his ReSource Intermediary Group through which insurance and reinsurance companies and other financial institution clients of the firm could anonymously communicate their reinsurance, buying, selling, joint-venture, partnering and other commercial interests to an array of prospective counterparties.

In 1993, with a small number of investors, he launched InterVest, an electronic financial facility for anonymous secondary market trading of corporate and municipal bonds and other fixed income securities among institutional investors, brokers and dealers. It was the first SEC-regulated "Proprietary Trading System" (a precursor to the current Alternative Trading Systems). In 1995, InterVest entered into an agreement with Bloomberg LP to provide dynamic interactive access to its trading platform and to display all current orders and transactions through the roughly 100,000 Bloomberg terminals then installed.

In 1996, exclusive access to InterVest through the Bloomberg terminal network (via <ITV-GO>) was launched and continued until early1998.

In 1999, Fondren launched the first Internet-based facility for single-price auctions of new investment-grade corporate bonds and asset-backed securities.

Fondren also invented "LegacyLoans", a form of non-recourse consumer loan collateralized solely by the future death benefit of a qualifying life insurance policy. Because policy owners borrow against (rather than sell) their life insurance policies, they continue to own that asset, and use the systematic loan advances to satisfy all future premium payments – leaving the guaranteed remainder of the death benefit to their beneficiaries.

In 2011, Fondren founded DelphX LLC, the original DelphX corporate entity. In April 2019, Fondren was replaced as CEO of the DelphX companies by Co-CEOs, Patricia Ziegler and Stephen Bacso, who each subsequently resigned, and Fondren thereafter continued as a member of the DelphX board.

In December 2020, Fondren resigned from the DelphX board. In February 2021, DelphX issued a press release stating that Fondren's prior resignation had been accepted, and further stating that Fondren was fired for cause. The company press release stated, "It has recently been discovered by the Board that, contrary to fiduciary duties to the Company, Mr. Fondren has been using the Company's property to advance his own personal interests."

In March 2021, Fondren filed suit against DelphX in the Court of Common Please of Chester County, Pennsylvania, accusing DelphX of defamation of character, breach of contract and other wrongful acts. In March 2022, DelphX Corporation filed suit against Fondren in the United States District Court for the Eastern District of Pennsylvania, accusing Fondren of multiple acts of wrongdoing. In July 2022, DelphX and Fondren amicably resolved their disputes.

== Federal antitrust lawsuit ==
Following the launch of InterVest, few bond dealers chose to post prices as the system reduced the need for their services and threatened their margins. According to Thomas A. Price, a senior vice-president at Bank of New York's BondNet, Fondren was put "in the penalty box" for trying to change the entrenched system. Bloomberg dropped InterVest in early 1998.

As a result, a federal antitrust lawsuit was launched alleging that Bloomberg LP and several Wall Street firms (including SG Cowen Securities; Liberty Brokerage Investment; Liberty Brokerage, Inc.; Liberty Brokerage Securities, Inc.; Deutsche Bank Securities; Cantor Fitzgerald Securities; Salomon Smith Barney, Inc.; Merrill Lynch & Co.; J.P. Morgan Securities, Inc.; Bear Stearns, Co. Inc.; S.G. Cowen Securities Corp.; and Deutsche Bank Securities Corp.) helped orchestrate the demise of InterVest Financial Services Inc.'s Bloomberg-based bond trading system.

In 2002, InterVest settled out of court with each of the defendants except Cowen. InterVest's Web-based system was sold to GFI Group, Inc., an inter-dealer broker. The court ultimately found that InterVest had not provided sufficient evidence to prove, beyond reasonable doubt, that Cowen had committed an antitrust violation. Cowen was granted summary judgment.

InterVest appealed the lower court's opinion in the United States Court of Appeals for the Third Circuit. In the conclusion of the Court of Appeals panel, Judge Edward R. Becker remarked, "Though the evidence presented could give rise to a reasonable inference that a conspiracy existed, it could just as easily give rise to the inference that Cowen acted independently and rationally in refusing to deal with InterVest. Defendant presented a coherent explanation for the structure of the market and plaintiff did not claim this explanation was pretextual. Defendant also admitted to preferring that system and the high spreads that went with it and confessed that it had little interest in making things easier for a company looking to change that system and compete with it for customers. So long as it did so independently, Cowen did not violate the law and I find that scenario is equally inferable from the evidence before me as the illicit one argued by InterVest is."

== Congressional testimony ==
Fondren was invited to provide expert testimony before the Subcommittee on Finance and Hazardous Materials on June 18, 1998 about the lack of price transparency in the bond markets and the negative consequences for issuers, investors and the markets.

Fondren's testimony is extensively quoted in the Background and Need for Legislation section of The Bond Price Competition Improvement Act of 1999.
