= Kiyoko Okabe =

Kiyoko Okabe (岡部 喜代子, Okabe Kiyoko) served as a justice of the Supreme Court of Japan from 2010 to 2019.

She was born on March 20, 1949. She attended Keio University (graduating in 1971) and completed the master’s program at the university’s law school in 1974. In 1974, she was admitted as a legal apprentice, and would not begin her judicial career until 1976. From 1976-1985, Okabe worked as an assistant judge for various court systems, including the Sapporo District Court. She thereafter worked as a judge for other district courts until entering private practice in 1993. On April 12, 2010, Okabe was appointed as a justice of the Supreme Court of Japan. Prior to her most recent judgeship, she worked as a law professor at Toyo University.

Okabe retired on March 19, 2019 (the day before her seventieth birthday). This is because the Supreme Court of Japan has a mandatory retirement age of 70.

== See also ==
- Supreme Court of Japan
