= Indy (software) =

Indy is a music discovery tool for computers with an Internet connection. It uses collaborative filtering to automatically download music the user is likely to enjoy listening to. Indy is similar to iRATE radio, but does not include a built-in file manager. Indy automatically downloads music from public websites and continuously plays new titles. The user can rate the titles during or after playback. These ratings are then matched against the tastes of other listeners, and newly downloaded titles are meant to be more likely to be enjoyable to the listener.

Every track can be given a rating from 1 to 5 stars. If the song is still playing when the user assigns the score, a rating lower than 3 stars skips to the next title. Indy's user interface is highly simplified. The makers of the program recommend to only use Indy to discover music, and to utilize other applications to organize and repeatedly listen to it.

Indy is written in Java and therefore runs on most modern operating systems.

As of October 3, 2007, the official homepage contains only an image and the text Revver is undergoing maintenance at the moment. We promise to return soon.
