= Hyphanet =

Peer-to-peer Internet platform for censorship-resistant communication

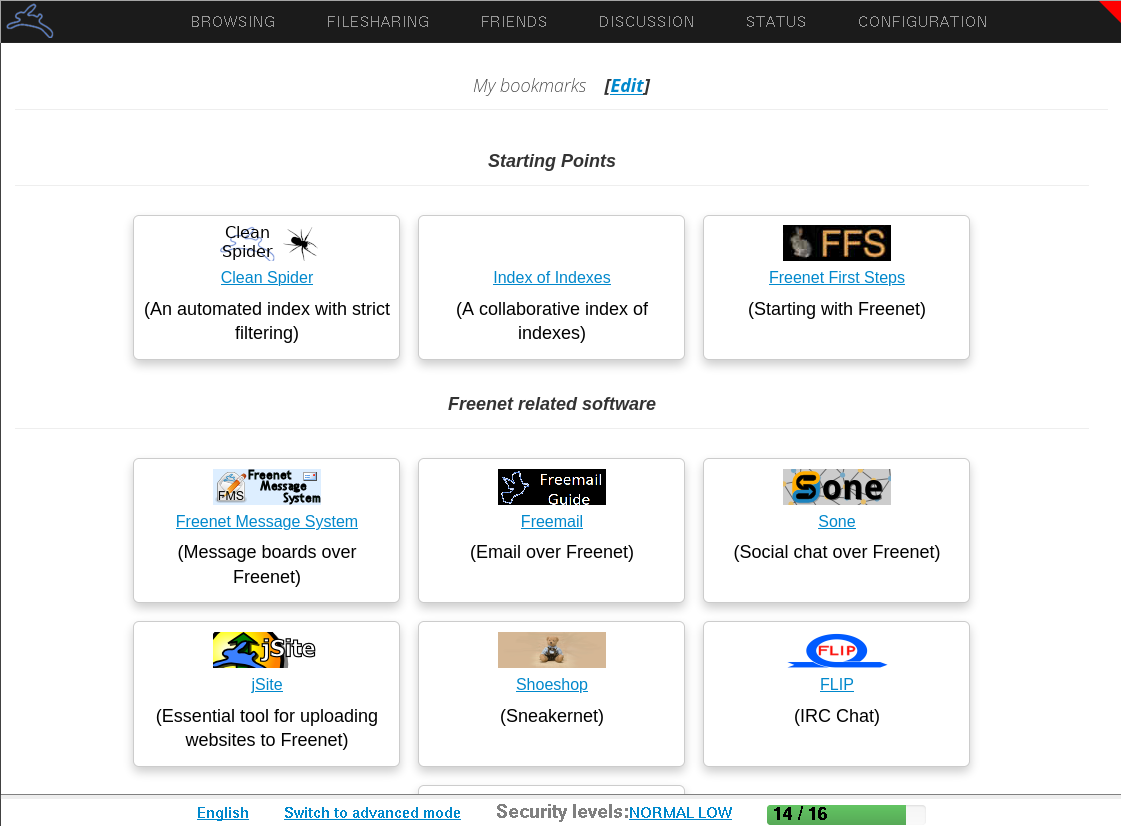
- FProxy index page (Freenet 0.7)
- Developer
- Release: March 2000; 26 years ago
- Stable release: 0.7.5 build 1507 / 13 September 2026
- Written in: Java
- Operating system: Cross-platform: Unix-like (Android, Linux, BSD, macOS), Microsoft Windows
- Platform: Java
- Available in: English, French, Italian, German, Dutch, Spanish, Portuguese, Swedish, Norwegian, Chinese, Russian
- Type: Anonymity application, peer-to-peer, friend-to-friend, overlay network, mix network, distributed data store
- License: GNU General Public License version 3 only
- Website: www.hyphanet.org
- Repository: https://github.com/hyphanet/fred

Hyphanet (until mid-2023: Freenet) is a peer-to-peer platform for censorship-resistant, anonymous communication. It uses a decentralized distributed data store to keep and deliver information, and has a suite of free software for publishing and communicating on the Web without fear of censorship. Both Freenet and some of its associated tools were originally designed by Ian Clarke, who defined Freenet's goal as providing freedom of speech on the Internet with strong anonymity protection.

The distributed data store of Hyphanet is used by third-party programs and plugins to provide microblogging and media sharing, anonymous and decentralised version tracking, blogging, a generic web of trust for decentralized spam resistance, and Shoeshop for using Freenet over sneakernet.

== History ==
The origin of Hyphanet was Ian Clarke's student project at the University of Edinburgh, which he completed as a graduation requirement in the summer of 1999. His unpublished report provided the foundation for a paper written in collaboration with other researchers, "Freenet: A Distributed Anonymous Information Storage and Retrieval System" (2001). According to CiteSeer, it became one of the most frequently cited computer science articles in 2002.

=== Name and continuity ===
The project was known as Freenet for most of its history and was renamed to Hyphanet in 2023. Academic and technical literature published before the rename generally refers to the system as Freenet.

Hyphanet can provide anonymity on the Internet by storing small encrypted snippets of content distributed on the computers of its users and connecting only through intermediate computers which pass on requests for content and sending them back without knowing the contents of the full file. This is similar to how routers on the Internet route packets without knowing anything about files except Hyphanet has caching, a layer of strong encryption, and no reliance on centralized structures. This allows users to publish anonymously or retrieve various kinds of information.

=== Release history ===
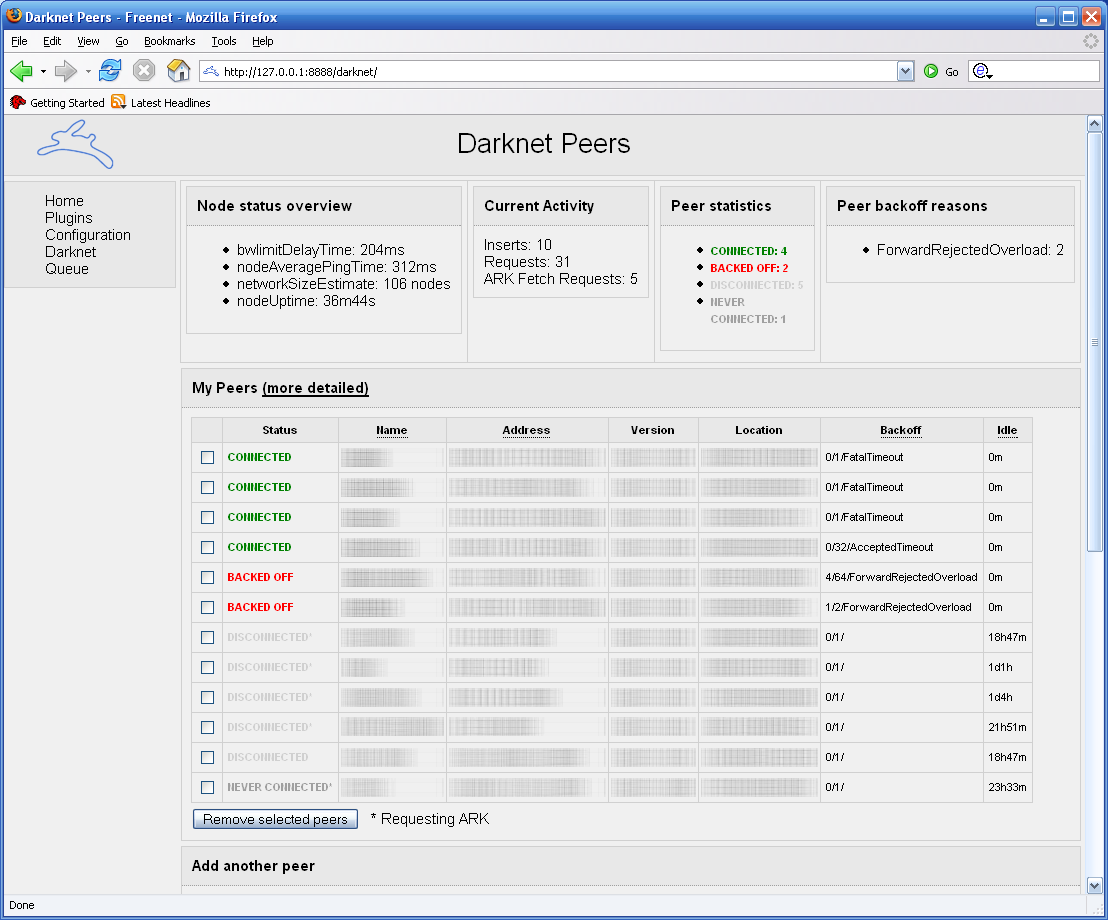
The Freenet 0.7 darknet peers list.

Hyphanet has been under continuous development since 2000.

Freenet 0.7, released on 8 May 2008, is a major re-write incorporating a number of fundamental changes. The most fundamental change is support for darknet operation. Version 0.7 offered two modes of operation: a mode in which it connects only to friends, and an opennet-mode in which it connects to any other Freenet user. Both modes can be run simultaneously. When a user switches to pure darknet operation, Freenet becomes very difficult to detect from the outside. The transport layer created for the darknet mode allows communication over restricted routes as commonly found in mesh networks, as long as these connections follow a small-world structure. Other modifications include switching from TCP to UDP, which allows UDP hole punching along with faster transmission of messages between peers in the network.

Freenet 0.7.5, released on 12 June 2009, offers a variety of improvements over 0.7. These include reduced memory usage, faster insert and retrieval of content, significant improvements to the FProxy web interface used for browsing freesites, and a large number of smaller bugfixes, performance enhancements, and usability improvements. Version 0.7.5 also shipped with a new version of the Windows installer.

As of build 1226, released on 30 July 2009, features that were written include significant security improvements against both attackers acting on the network and physical seizure of the computer running the node.

As of build 1468, released on 11 July 2015, the Freenet core stopped using the db4o database and laid the foundation for an efficient interface to the Web of Trust plugin which provides spam resistance.

Freenet has always been free software, but until 2011 it required users to install Java. This problem was solved by making Freenet compatible with OpenJDK, a free and open source implementation of the Java Platform.

On 11 February 2015, Freenet received the SUMA-Award for "protection against total surveillance".

== Features and user interface ==
Hyphanet served as the model for the Japanese peer to peer file-sharing programs Winny, Share and Perfect Dark, but this model differs from p2p networks such as Bittorrent and emule. Freenet separates the underlying network structure and protocol from how users interact with the network; as a result, there are a variety of ways to access content on the Freenet network. The simplest is via FProxy, which is integrated with the node software and provides a web interface to content on the network. Using FProxy, a user can browse freesites (websites that use normal HTML and related tools, but whose content is stored within Freenet rather than on a traditional web server). The web interface is also used for most configuration and node management tasks. Through the use of separate applications or plugins loaded into the node software, users can interact with the network in other ways, such as forums similar to web forums or Usenet or interfaces more similar to traditional P2P "filesharing" interfaces.

While Freenet provides an HTTP interface for browsing freesites, it is not a proxy for the World Wide Web; Freenet can be used to access only the content that has been previously inserted into the Freenet network. In this way, it is more similar to Tor's onion services than to anonymous proxy software like Tor's proxy.

Hyphanet's focus lies on free speech and anonymity. Because of that, Hyphanet acts differently at certain points that are (directly or indirectly) related to the anonymity part. Hyphanet attempts to protect the anonymity of both people inserting data into the network (uploading) and those retrieving data from the network (downloading). Unlike file sharing systems, there is no need for the uploader to remain on the network after uploading a file or group of files. Instead, during the upload process, the files are broken into chunks and stored on a variety of other computers on the network. When downloading, those chunks are found and reassembled. Every node on the Freenet network contributes storage space to hold files and bandwidth that it uses to route requests from its peers.

As a direct result of the anonymity requirements, the node requesting content does not normally connect directly to the node that has it; instead, the request is routed across several intermediaries, none of which know which node made the request or which one had it. As a result, the total bandwidth required by the network to transfer a file is higher than in other systems, which can result in slower transfers, especially for infrequently accessed content.

Since version 0.7, Hyphanet has offered two different levels of security: opennet and darknet. With opennet, users connect to arbitrary other users. With darknet, users connect only to "friends" with whom they previously exchanged public keys, named node-references. Both modes can be used together.

== Content ==
Hyphanet's founders argue that true freedom of speech comes only with true anonymity and that the beneficial uses of Hyphanet outweigh its negative uses. Their view is that free speech, in itself, is not in contradiction with any other consideration—the information is not the crime. Hyphanet attempts to remove the possibility of any group imposing its beliefs or values on any data. Although many states censor communications to different extents, they all share one commonality in that a body must decide what information to censor and what information to allow. What may be acceptable to one group of people may be considered offensive or even dangerous to another. In essence, the purpose of Freenet is to ensure that no one is allowed to decide what is acceptable.

Reports of Freenet's use in authoritarian nations is difficult to track due to the very nature of Freenet's goals. One group, Freenet China, used to introduce the Freenet software to Chinese users starting from 2001 and distribute it within China through e-mails and on disks after the group's website was blocked by the Chinese authorities on the mainland. It was reported that in 2002 Freenet China had several thousand dedicated users. However, Hyphanet opennet traffic was blocked in China around the 2010s.

== Technical design ==
The Hyphanet file sharing network stores documents and allows them to be retrieved later by an associated key, as is now possible with protocols such as HTTP. The network is designed to be highly survivable. The system has no central servers and is not subject to the control of any one individual or organization, including the designers of Freenet. The codebase size is over 192,000 lines of code. Information stored on Hyphanet is distributed around the network and stored on several different nodes. Encryption of data and relaying of requests makes it difficult to determine who inserted content into Hyphanet, who requested that content, or where the content was stored. This protects the anonymity of participants, and also makes it very difficult to censor specific content. Content is stored encrypted, making it difficult for even the operator of a node to determine what is stored on that node. This provides plausible deniability; which, in combination with request relaying, means that safe harbor laws that protect service providers may also protect Hyphanet node operators. When asked about the topic, Freenet developers defer to the EFF discussion which says that not being able to filter anything is a safe choice.

=== Distributed storage and caching of data ===
Like Winny, Share and Perfect Dark, Hyphanet not only transmits data between nodes but actually stores them, working as a huge distributed cache. To achieve this, each node allocates some amount of disk space to store data; this is configurable by the node operator, but is typically several GB (or more).

Files on Hyphanet are typically split into multiple small blocks, with duplicate blocks created to provide redundancy. Each block is handled independently, meaning that a single file may have parts stored on many different nodes.

Information flow in Hyphanet is different from networks like eMule or BitTorrent; in Freenet:

1. A user wishing to share a file or update a freesite "inserts" the file "to the network"
2. After "insertion" is finished, the publishing node is free to shut down, because the file is stored in the network. It will remain available for other users whether or not the original publishing node is online. No single node is responsible for the content; instead, it is replicated to many different nodes.

Two advantages of this design are high reliability and anonymity. Information remains available even if the publisher node goes offline, and is anonymously spread over many hosting nodes as encrypted blocks, not entire files.

The key disadvantage of the storage method is that no one node is responsible for any chunk of data. If a piece of data is not retrieved for some time and a node keeps getting new data, it will drop the old data sometime when its allocated disk space is fully used. In this way Hyphanet tends to 'forget' data which is not retrieved regularly (see also Effect).

While users can insert data into the network, there is no way to delete data. Due to Freenet's anonymous nature the original publishing node or owner of any piece of data is unknown. The only way data can be removed is if users don't request it.

=== Network ===
Typically, a host computer on the network runs the software that acts as a node, and it connects to other hosts running that same software to form a large distributed, variable-size network of peer nodes. Some nodes are end user nodes, from which documents are requested and presented to human users. Other nodes serve only to route data. All nodes communicate with each other identically – there are no dedicated "clients" or "servers". It is not possible for a node to rate another node except by its capacity to insert and fetch data associated with a key. This is unlike most other P2P networks where node administrators can employ a ratio system, where users have to share a certain amount of content before they can download. Hyphanet may also be considered a small world network.

The Hyphanet protocol is intended to be used on a network of complex topology, such as the Internet (Internet Protocol). Each node knows only about some number of other nodes that it can reach directly (its conceptual "neighbors"), but any node can be a neighbor to any other; no hierarchy or other structure is intended. Each message is routed through the network by passing from neighbor to neighbor until it reaches its destination. As each node passes a message to a neighbor, it does not know whether the neighbor will forward the message to another node, or is the final destination or original source of the message. This is intended to protect the anonymity of users and publishers.

Each node maintains a data store containing documents associated with keys, and a routing table associating nodes with records of their performance in retrieving different keys.

=== Protocol ===
A typical request sequence. The request moves through the network from node to node, backing out of a dead-end (step 3) and a loop (step 7) before locating the desired file.

The Hyphanet protocol uses a key-based routing protocol, similar to distributed hash tables. The routing algorithm changed significantly in version 0.7. Prior to version 0.7, Freenet used a heuristic routing algorithm where each node had no fixed location, and routing was based on which node had served a key closest to the key being fetched (in version 0.3) or which is estimated to serve it faster (in version 0.5). In either case, new connections were sometimes added to downstream nodes (i.e. the node that answered the request) when requests succeeded, and old nodes were discarded in least recently used order (or something close to it). Oskar Sandberg's research (during the development of version 0.7) shows that this "path folding" is critical, and that a very simple routing algorithm will suffice provided there is path folding.

The disadvantage of this is that it is very easy for an attacker to find Hyphanet nodes, and connect to them, because every node is continually attempting to find new connections. In version 0.7, Hyphanet starts supporting both "opennet" (similar to the old algorithms, but simpler), and "darknet" (all node connections are set up manually, so only your friends know your node's IP address). Darknet is less convenient, but much more secure against a distant attacker.

This change required major changes in the routing algorithm. Every node has a location, which is a number between 0 and 1. When a key is requested, first the node checks the local data store. If it's not found, the key's hash is turned into another number in the same range, and the request is routed to the node whose location is closest to the key. This goes on until some number of hops is exceeded, there are no more nodes to search, or the data is found. If the data is found, it is cached on each node along the path. So there is no one source node for a key, and attempting to find where it is currently stored will result in it being cached more widely. Essentially the same process is used to insert a document into the network: the data is routed according to the key until it runs out of hops, and if no existing document is found with the same key, it is stored on each node. If older data is found, the older data is propagated and returned to the originator, and the insert "collides".

But this works only if the locations are clustered in the right way. Hyphanet assumes that the darknet (a subset of the global social network) is a small-world network, and nodes constantly attempt to swap locations (using the Metropolis–Hastings algorithm) in order to minimize their distance to their neighbors. If the network actually is a small-world network, Freenet should find data reasonably quickly; ideally on the order of $O\big([\log(n)]^2\big)$ hops in big O notation. However, it does not guarantee that data will be found at all.

Eventually, either the document is found or the hop limit is exceeded. The terminal node sends a reply that makes its way back to the originator along the route specified by the intermediate nodes' records of pending requests. The intermediate nodes may choose to cache the document along the way. Besides saving bandwidth, this also makes documents harder to censor as there is no one "source node".

=== Effect ===
The effect of the node specialising on the particular location.

Initially, the locations in darknet are distributed randomly. This means that routing of requests is essentially random. In opennet connections are established by a join request which provides an optimized network structure if the existing network is already optimized. So the data in a newly started Hyphanet will be distributed somewhat randomly.

As location swapping (on darknet) and path folding (on opennet) progress, nodes which are close to one another will increasingly have close locations, and nodes which are far away will have distant locations. Data with similar keys will be stored on the same node.

The result is that the network will self-organize into a distributed, clustered structure where nodes tend to hold data items that are close together in key space. There will probably be multiple such clusters throughout the network, any given document being replicated numerous times, depending on how much it is used. This is a kind of "spontaneous symmetry breaking", in which an initially symmetric state (all nodes being the same, with random initial keys for each other) leads to a highly asymmetric situation, with nodes coming to specialize in data that has closely related keys.

There are forces which tend to cause clustering (shared closeness data spreads throughout the network), and forces that tend to break up clusters (local caching of commonly used data). These forces will be different depending on how often data is used, so that seldom-used data will tend to be on just a few nodes which specialize in providing that data, and frequently used items will be spread widely throughout the network. This automatic mirroring counteracts the times when web traffic becomes overloaded, and due to a mature network's intelligent routing, a network of size n should require only log(n) time to retrieve a document on average.

=== Keys ===
Keys are hashes: there is no notion of semantic closeness when speaking of key closeness. Therefore, there will be no correlation between key closeness and similar popularity of data as there might be if keys did exhibit some semantic meaning, thus avoiding bottlenecks caused by popular subjects.

There are two main varieties of keys in use on Hyphanet, the Content Hash Key (CHK) and the Signed Subspace Key (SSK). A subtype of SSKs is the Updatable Subspace Key (USK) which adds versioning to allow secure updating of content.

A CHK is a SHA-256 hash of a document (after encryption, which itself depends on the hash of the plaintext) and thus a node can check that the document returned is correct by hashing it and checking the digest against the key. This key contains the meat of the data on Freenet. It carries all the binary data building blocks for the content to be delivered to the client for reassembly and decryption. The CHK is unique by nature and provides tamperproof content. A hostile node altering the data under a CHK will immediately be detected by the next node or the client. CHKs also reduce the redundancy of data since the same data will have the same CHK and when multiple sites reference the same large files, they can reference to the same CHK.

SSKs are based on public-key cryptography. Currently Hyphanet uses the DSA algorithm. Documents inserted under SSKs are signed by the inserter, and this signature can be verified by every node to ensure that the data is not tampered with. SSKs can be used to establish a verifiable pseudonymous identity on Freenet, and allow for multiple documents to be inserted securely by a single person. Files inserted with an SSK are effectively immutable, since inserting a second file with the same name can cause collisions. USKs resolve this by adding a version number to the keys which is also used for providing update notification for keys registered as bookmarks in the web interface. Another subtype of the SSK is the Keyword Signed Key, or KSK, in which the key pair is generated in a standard way from a simple human-readable string. Inserting a document using a KSK allows the document to be retrieved and decrypted if and only if the requester knows the human-readable string; this allows for more convenient (but less secure) URIs for users to refer to.

== Scalability ==
A network is said to be scalable if its performance does not deteriorate even if the network is very large. The scalability of Freenet is being evaluated, but similar architectures have been shown to scale logarithmically.

== Darknet versus opennet ==
As of version 0.7, Hyphanet supports both "darknet" and "opennet" connections. Opennet connections are made automatically by nodes with opennet enabled, while darknet connections are manually established between users that know and trust each other. Freenet developers describe the trust needed as "will not crack their Freenet node". Opennet connections are easy to use, but darknet connections are more secure against attackers on the network, and can make it difficult for an attacker (such as an oppressive government) to even determine that a user is running Freenet in the first place.

The core innovation in Freenet 0.7 is to allow a globally scalable darknet, capable (at least in theory) of supporting millions of users. Previous darknets, such as WASTE, have been limited to relatively small disconnected networks. The scalability of Freenet is made possible by the fact that human relationships tend to form small-world networks, a property that can be exploited to find short paths between any two people. The work is based on a speech given at DEF CON 13 by Ian Clarke and Swedish mathematician Oskar Sandberg. Furthermore, the routing algorithm is capable of routing over a mixture of opennet and darknet connections, allowing people who have only a few friends using the network to get the performance from having sufficient connections while still receiving some of the security benefits of darknet connections. This also means that small darknets where some users also have opennet connections are fully integrated into the whole Freenet network, allowing all users access to all content, whether they run opennet, darknet, or a hybrid of the two, except for darknet pockets connected only by a single hybrid node.

== Tools and applications ==
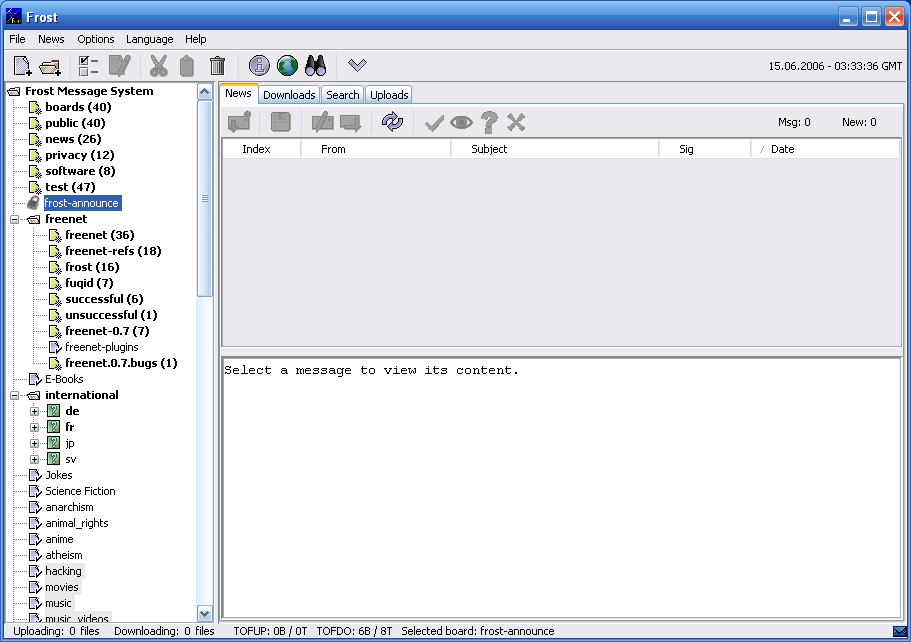
Screenshot of Frost running on Microsoft Windows

Unlike many other P2P applications Freenet does not provide comprehensive functionality itself. Freenet is modular and features an API called Freenet Client Protocol (FCP) for other programs to use to implement services such as message boards, file sharing, or online chat.

=== Communication ===
Freenet Messaging System (FMS)

FMS was designed to address problems with Frost such as denial of service attacks and spam. Users publish trust lists, and each user downloads messages only from identities they trust and identities trusted by identities they trust. FMS is developed anonymously and can be downloaded from the FMS freesite within Freenet. It does not have an official site on the normal Internet. It features random post delay, support for many identities, and a distinction between trusting a user's posts and trusting their trust list. It is written in C++ and is a separate application from Freenet which uses the Freenet Client Protocol (FCP) to interface with Freenet.

Frost

Frost includes support for convenient file sharing, but its design is inherently vulnerable to spam and denial of service attacks. Frost can be downloaded from the Frost home page on SourceForge, or from the Frost freesite within Freenet. It is not endorsed by the Freenet developers. Frost is written in Java and is a separate application from Freenet.

Sone

Sone provides a simpler interface inspired by Facebook with public anonymous discussions and image galleries. It provides an API for control from other programs is also used to implement a comment system for static websites in the regular internet.

=== Utilities ===
jSite

jSite is a tool to upload websites. It handles keys and manages uploading files.

Infocalypse

Infocalypse is an extension for the distributed revision control system Mercurial. It uses an optimized structure to minimize the number of requests to retrieve new data, and allows supporting a repository by securely reuploading most parts of the data without requiring the owner's private keys.

=== Libraries ===
FCPLib

FCPLib (Freenet Client Protocol Library) aims to be a cross-platform natively compiled set of C++-based functions for storing and retrieving information to and from Freenet. FCPLib supports Windows NT/2K/XP, Debian, BSD, Solaris, and macOS.

lib-pyFreenet

lib-pyFreenet exposes Freenet functionality to Python programs. Infocalypse uses it.

== Vulnerabilities ==
=== HTL attack controversy ===
In 2011, an officer at an ICAC taskforce in Missouri attempted to use what they believed was a vulnerability in the Hops-To-Live feature in Hyphanet. When a node makes a request, it specifies a number $n$, where $n$ is the amount of different times the request for information can be bounced through the network to other nodes. The ICAC falsely assumed that the HTL decreases similar to a counter, where the node next in line performs $n-1$ on the counter indiscriminately, when in actuality, the node next in line has a 50% chance of subtracting the current count by one or not, a strategy specifically implemented to avoid that exact attack that was present in Hyphanet since 2008.

In a separate paper in 2017, Levine et al. claimed to have found a similar probabilistic method relying on the HTL counter. The Hyphanet maintainer at the time criticized the paper, claiming that it made the same critical misassumption regarding the hop counter behavior, and had also used false math that relied on overly-optimistic conditions in both the 2017 paper and another one released in 2020.

Brian Levine has developed other pieces of software such as Torrential Downpour (law enforcement tool for BitTorrents), which have been similarly criticized as potentially outputting false information, as individuals who were searched with evidence from Torrential Downpour often did not have any evidence of downloaded or logs of viewed illicit material, nor any evidence that they actually even used BitTorrent software.

==== Vulnerability court cases ====
===== Canada =====
An agent from the Peel Regional Police attempted to use the original ICAC vulnerability on a defendant in a child sexual exploitation material investigation by filing a search warrant for an IP he claimed was requesting a known video of sexual abuse of a child. During the trial, the defendant had argued that both the surveillance on Hyphanet and the subsequent subpoena of his IP were unsound. After details regarding the attack were disclosed to the judge by the constable, the judge ruled that the officer overplayed the power of the attack and omitted information regarding key caveats about the attack that prevented the original judge from making an informed decision, which was considered a violation of the right to full disclosure, though the judge only dismissed the rest of the evidence from being used due to semi-unrelated issues with the IP address subpoena to TekSavvy, arguing that because the officer testified that he was advised that the caveats in the methodology were privileged information by a legal team, and that there was little proof of the false evidence having been used purposeful in bad-faith, the Hyphanet attack by itself did not classify as a purposeful, egregious, or overly intrusive abuse of the legal system that is needed for evidence to be dismissed in Canada.

===== United States =====
The ICAC used its method to file search warrants across the United States.

Brian Levine, since his 2017 paper, has advertised his services to law enforcement in the United States, despite criticism regarding methodology, with a 2022 appeal revealing that Levine and other unnamed researchers regularly distributed software that was advertised under the name Freenet Roundup, as part of a greater brand of law enforcement software called RoundUp, which was targeted towards P2P networks.

The United States Court of Appeals for the Eighth Circuit in Missouri in 2020 ruled that the Levine method used in a case was illegitimate as they decided that it could not differentiate between an active requester and a passive node, but that due to the fact that the authorities in that instance did not knowingly use the method in bad-faith, and that there was no proof of an explicitly abusive process involved within the signing of the original search warrant for evidence, the evidence against the accused was not dismissed.

==== Routing Table Insertion (RTI) ====
Using Freenet 0.7.5, several attacks have been identified via the analysis of Freenet code, routing and request processing that seriously damage the anonymity of Freenet and similar systems. While the attack doesn't work in special cases, it works in most ordinary cases. This type of attack is serious because it can be used to discover other attacks.

As nodes become better connected, the number of victim nodes that can be attacked with the RTI attack increases.

== Notability ==
Freenet has had significant publicity in the mainstream press, including articles in The New York Times, and coverage on CNN, 60 Minutes II, the BBC, The Guardian, and elsewhere.

Freenet received the SUMA-Award 2014 for "protection against total surveillance".

== See also ==
- Peer-to-peer web hosting
- Rendezvous protocol
- Anonymous P2P
- Crypto-anarchism
- Cypherpunk
- Distributed file system
- Freedom of information
- Friend-to-friend

=== Comparable software ===
- GNUnet
- I2P
- InterPlanetary File System
- Java Anon Proxy (also known as JonDonym)
- Osiris
- Perfect Dark – also creates a distributed data store shared by anonymous nodes; the successor to Share, which itself is the successor of Winny
- Tahoe-LAFS
- ZeroNet
