= Distributed data store =

Computer network with multiple nodes to store information

A distributed data store is a computer network where information is stored on more than one node, often in a replicated fashion. It is usually specifically used to refer to either a distributed database where users store information on a number of nodes, or a computer network in which users store information on a number of peer network nodes.

== Distributed databases ==
Distributed databases are usually non-relational databases that enable a quick access to data over a large number of nodes. Some distributed databases expose rich query abilities while others are limited to a key-value store semantics. Examples of limited distributed databases are Google's Bigtable, which is much more than a distributed file system or a peer-to-peer network, Amazon's Dynamo and Microsoft Azure Storage.

As the ability of arbitrary querying is not as important as the availability, designers of distributed data stores have increased the latter at an expense of consistency. But the high-speed read/write access results in reduced consistency, as it is not possible to guarantee both consistency and availability on a partitioned network, as stated by the CAP theorem.

== Peer network node data stores ==
In peer network data stores, the user can usually reciprocate and allow other users to use their computer as a storage node as well. Information may or may not be accessible to other users depending on the design of the network.

Most peer-to-peer networks do not have distributed data stores in that the user's data is only available when their node is on the network. However, this distinction is somewhat blurred in a system such as BitTorrent, where it is possible for the originating node to go offline but the content to continue to be served. Still, this is only the case for individual files requested by the redistributors, as contrasted with networks such as Hyphanet, Winny, Share and Perfect Dark where any node may be storing any part of the files on the network.

Distributed data stores typically use an error detection and correction technique. Some distributed data stores (such as Parchive over NNTP) use forward error correction techniques to recover the original file when parts of that file are damaged or unavailable. Others try again to download that file from a different mirror.

== Examples ==
=== Distributed non-relational databases ===
Product	License	High availability	Notes
Apache Accumulo	AL2		
Aerospike	AGPL		
Apache Cassandra	AL2	Yes	formerly used by Facebook
Apache Ignite	AL2		
Bigtable	Proprietary		used by Google
Couchbase	AL2		used by LinkedIn, PayPal, and eBay
CrateDB	AL2	Yes	
Apache Druid	AL2		used by Netflix, and Yahoo
Dynamo	Proprietary		used by Amazon
etcd	AL2	Yes	
Hazelcast	AL2, Proprietary		
HBase	AL2	Yes	formerly used by Facebook
Hypertable	GPL 2		Baidu
MongoDB	SSPL		
MySQL NDB Cluster	GPL 2	Yes	SQL and NoSQL APIs
Riak	AL2	Yes	
Redis	BSD License	Yes	
ScyllaDB	Proprietary		
Voldemort	AL2		used by LinkedIn

=== Peer network node data stores ===
- BitTorrent
- Blockchain (database)
- Chord project
- Hyphanet (formerly Freenet)
- GNUnet
- IPFS
- Mnet
- Napster
- NNTP (the distributed data storage protocol used for Usenet news)
- Unity, of the software Perfect Dark
- Share
- Siacoin
- DeNet
- Storage@home
- Tahoe-LAFS
- Winny
- ZeroNet

== See also ==
- Cooperative storage cloud
- Data store
- Keyspace, the DDS schema
- Distributed hash table
- Distributed cache
- Cyber Resilience
