= OpenResty =

Web server based on nginx and LuaJIT

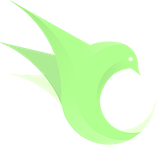
- Other names: ngx_openresty
- Original author: Yichun Zhang
- Developers: OpenResty Software Foundation; OpenResty, Inc.
- Release: September 2009; 17 years ago
- Stable release: 1.31.1.1 / 29 May 2026; 5 months ago
- Written in: C
- License: FreeBSD license
- Website: openresty.org/en/
- Repository: github.com/openresty/openresty

OpenResty is an nginx distribution which includes the LuaJIT interpreter for Lua scripts. The software was created by Yichun Zhang. It was originally sponsored by Taobao before 2011 and was mainly supported by Cloudflare from 2012 to 2016. Since 2017, it has been mainly supported by OpenResty Software Foundation and OpenResty Inc.

OpenResty is designed to build scalable web applications, web services, and dynamic web gateways. The OpenResty architecture is based on several nginx modules which have been extended in order to expand nginx into a web app server to handle large number of requests. OpenResty aims to run Lua server-side applications completely in the Nginx server, leveraging its event model to do non-blocking I/O not only for client connections, but also with remote resources, such as databases.

== History ==
In October 2007, OpenResty began at Yahoo! China as an Open API web service framework written mostly in Perl. Its README at CPAN describes it as "A REST wrapper for relational databases" enabling "100% JavaScript web sites and other RIAs" via PostgreSQL.

In September 2009, OpenResty was redeveloped at Taobao as ngx_openresty, a Lua application server based upon an extended repackaging of nginx and LuaJIT with plug-in server extension modules written in C.

== See also ==
- Tarantool
- List of application servers § Lua
