= MemcacheDB =

Computer software

- Stable release: 1.2.1 / December 25, 2008
- Written in: C
- Operating system: Cross-platform
- Type: distributed memory caching system
- License: BSD License
- Website: github.com/LMDB/memcachedb/

MemcacheDB (pronunciation: mem-cash-dee-bee) is a persistence enabled variant of memcached. MemcacheDB has not been actively maintained since 2009. It is a general-purpose distributed memory caching system often used to speed up dynamic database-driven websites by caching data and objects in memory. It was developed by Steve Chu and Howard Chu. The main difference between MemcacheDB and memcached is that MemcacheDB has its own key-value database system. based on Berkeley DB, so it is meant for persistent storage rather than limited to a non-persistent cache. A version of MemcacheDB using Lightning Memory-Mapped Database (LMDB) is also available, offering greater performance. MemcacheDB is accessed through the same protocol as memcached, so applications may use any memcached API as a means of accessing a MemcacheDB database.

MemcacheQ is a MemcacheDB variant that provides a simple message queue service.

Active development of MemcacheDB seems to have currently stopped; the web page hasn't been updated since 2009.

== See also ==
- Aerospike
- Couchbase Server
- LMDB
- Memcached
- Hazelcast
- Redis
- Tarantool
