= Little Squalicum Park =

Park in Bellingham, Washington

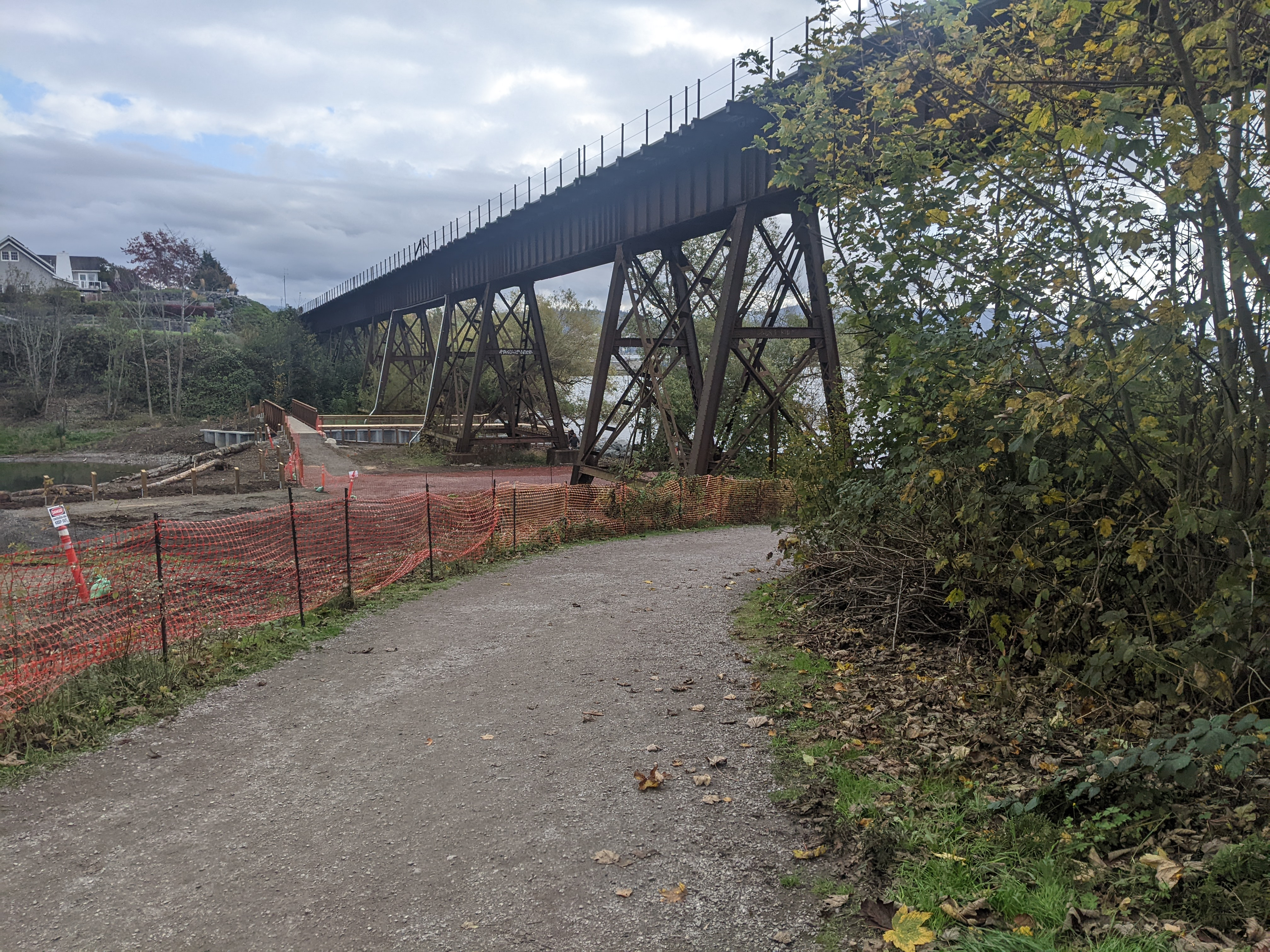
- Interactive map of Little Squalicum Park
- Location: Bellingham, Washington, U.S.
- Coordinates: 48°46′00″N 122°30′55″W
- Area: 24 acres (9.7 ha)
- Established: 1976

Little Squalicum Park is a city park in northwestern Bellingham, Washington. Situated along the Little Squalicum Creek, the 24-acre (10 ha) park contains an off-leash dog area and trails. The park also contains the Little Squalicum Pier, a 1,248 ft (380 m) long public pier overlying the Bellingham Bay tidelands.

== Description ==
Little Squalicum Park is an urban park at the northwestern edge of the city of Bellingham in Whatcom County, Washington, adjacent to the Bellingham Technical College campus to the east. The northeast corner of the park lies within Bellingham city limits, while the rest lies within Belliingham's Urban Growth Area and includes Whatcom County Parks property. A local road, Marine Drive, bisects the park. A portion of the park is bordered on the south end by the right of way of the BNSF Railway, which runs along an elevated trestle above the park.

The park provides access to Squalicum Beach on the other side of the railway trestle. It features various trails, an off-leash dog area, and ocean access via Squalicum Beach. It also contains Little Squalicum Pier, a public trestle pier which stretches 1,248 ft (380 m) out into the bay, making it the longest public pier in Washington state. The pier itself is within a strip of land deeded to the city, although the beach and intertidal zone is owned by the Port of Bellingham.

The park is named for the Little Squalicum Creek, a small stream which runs through the park and drains into Bellingham Bay. Little Squalicum has the smallest watershed out of the six creeks in the city.

== History ==
The park was established in 1976. From 1991 to 2001, the city acquired 8 acres (3.2 ha) of land for the park, bringing its total area up to 21 acres (8.5 ha); this increased to 24 acres (10 ha) by 2010.

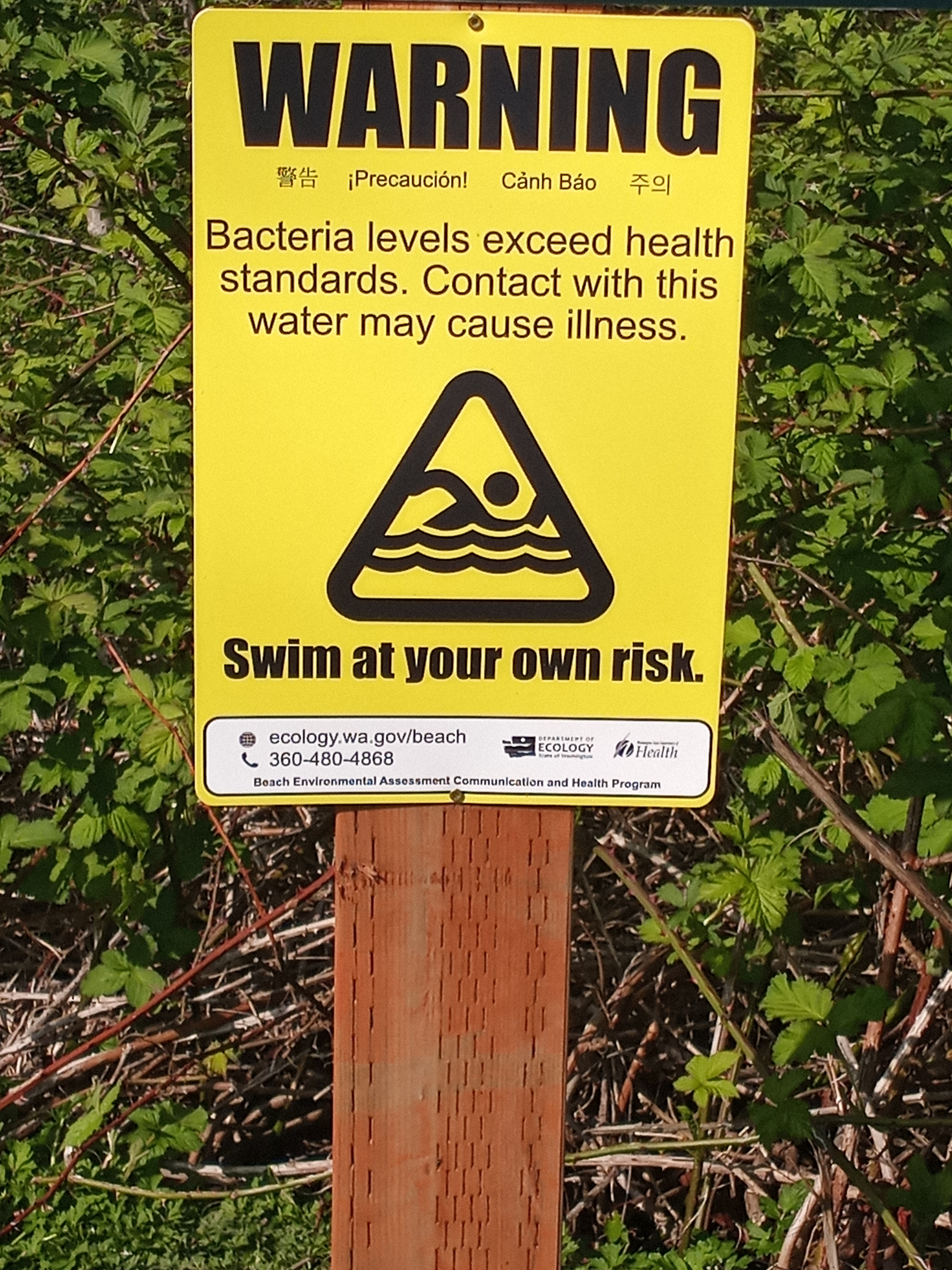
Sign posted at Little Squalicum Park

Chemical runoff and pollution from wood treatment by factories in the surrounding area contaminated soils in the park, and runoff from failed septic systems contaminated the sand of Squalicum Beach. The beach was closed in the mid-1980s due to this contamination, but visitors continued to access the park and removed signage which indicated the beach was closed. An additional source of contamination came from the site of the 19,000 sq ft (1,800 m^{2}) Eldridge Municipal Landfill, where local waste was burned and buried during the mid-to-late 1930s. Cleanup crews overseen by the state Department of Ecology excavated the site in 2011, removing contaminated soil and the remains of solid waste such as drywall, glass, and metal scraps. This material was moved to be reburied at the Roosevelt Regional Landfill in Klickitat County.

Plans to redevelop the park and the adjacent beach date to at least 1982. Cleanup and redevelopment efforts were complicated by the steep ravine which ran through the park, the BNSF rail trestle, and the needed cooperation between various local landowners. Prior to redevelopment, the creek ran from a large concrete culvert directly to the beach, blocking salmon.

=== Pier ===
In 1912, the Olympic Portland Cement Company constructed a large timber trestle pier into Bellingham Bay to allow railcars to deliver processed cement products to barges moored offshore. The trestle was roughly 1,800 ft (550 m) long and 14 ft (4.3 m) wide. It featured a single railroad track and connected to a 120 by 50 ft (37 by 15 m) wharf offshore, roughly ten feet above the seafloor at the far end. Initially known as Olympic Cement Company Pier, it was later known as Tilbury Pier and Lehigh Pier. Cement supply operations at the pier stopped around 1987.

By 2002, the city had begun to investigate acquiring the pier, now owned by the Tilbury Cement company. The coordinator of the city's Greenways Program theorized that it could be used as an extension to the Bay-to-Baker hiking trail. The same year, the city gained an access easement to the site, and later performed a series of assessments of the site throughout the 2010s. Redevelopment plans drew comparisons to the Taylor Dock Boardwalk, a public boardwalk in the southern part of the city. The Lehigh Northwest Cement Company donated the majority of the pier, a 1,248 ft (380 m) inner section, to the city in November 2021. The company retained ownership of the 600 ft (180 m) outer section and its supply pipe, which it was tasked with demolishing. This portion of the pier laid atop tidelands owned by the Washington State Department of Natural Resources. The demolition of the outer section began by January 2023.

After acquiring the pier, the city installed guardrails and grating on the structure, alongside solar and wind powered lighting. The state historical preservation office reviewed plans for the pier and supported its inclusion in the National Register of Historic Places. In 2024, the city government solicited names for the pier from the public and received over 900 names, mostly consisting of jokes and puns. After a recommendation from Parks and Recreation Department staff, the city council unanimously approved the name Little Squalicum Pier. The pier opened to the public on April 3, 2025.
