= Brian Aker =

American open-source hacker

- Born: August 4, 1972 (age 54); Lexington, Kentucky, US
- Education: Antioch College
- Occupation: HP Fellow
- Employer: HP
- Known for: Drizzle, Memcached, MySQL, Slashdot, Gearman
- Website: krow.net

Brian Aker, born August 4, 1972, in Lexington, Kentucky, US, is an open-source hacker who has worked on various Apache modules, the Slash system, and numerous storage engines for the MySQL database. Aker was Director of Architecture at MySQL AB until it was acquired by Sun Microsystems. He led Sun's web scaling research group, where he worked on the Drizzle database project. He later became a Distinguished Engineer for Sun Microsystems. After leaving Sun when Oracle acquired it, he became the CTO of Data Differential and provided support to open source projects such as libmemcached, Gearman and the Drizzle database project. Aker was currently a Fellow and VP at Hewlett Packard Enterprise.

After graduating with triple majors in environmental science, computing and mathematics, from Antioch College, Aker contributed to his first open source project, the 386BSD operating system. He then moved to work on Slashdot, where his initial task was to rewrite the database back-end to use Oracle. However, he extended the system to ensure it allowed multiple database back-ends, and became a published author along the way, writing Running Weblogs with Slash (ISBN 978-0596001001) with chromatic and Dave Krieger. From 2001 to 2007 he posted stories on Slashdot under the Author name of "Krow".

Aker first involved himself with the MySQL project in 1998. In 2001 he released an early prototype of MySQL with Perl-based functions and later went from VA Linux Systems to MySQL to lead development of the 4.1 and 5.0 versions of the MySQL Database Server. He has presented projects integrating MySQL with a number of technologies, including a working version of MySQL with Java-based functions with Eric Herman in 2004

Aker has been known to offer a Perl Certification Course at the University of Washington. He has also worked on the Virtual Hospital project, providing the Internet's first medical website, while at the University of Iowa Hospital and Clinics.

While not traveling and presenting at about six open source related conferences a year, he resides in Seattle, Washington. Some of the conferences Aker has presented at are OSCON, LinuxFest Northwest, Southern California Linux Expo, and the MySQL Users Conference & Expo. He is also the maintainer of the C client library for the Memcached server. He also maintains the current version of Gearman.

He is a commentator on the creation of NoSQL databases giving Ignite talks on its evolution.

A list of MySQL projects Brian Aker has created:

- The Drizzle Database server
- MySQL Archive Storage Engine
- MySQL Federated Storage Engine
- Memcached Storage Engine
- CSV Storage Engine
- Blackhole Storage Engine
- WebMethods (HTTP) Storage Engine
