= Lightweight programming language =

Programming language that is in some sense minimal

Lightweight programming languages are programming languages designed to have small memory footprint, are easy to implement (important when porting a language to different computer systems) or have minimalist syntax and features.

These programming languages have simple syntax and semantics, so one can learn them quickly and easily. Some lightweight languages (for example Lisp, Forth, and Tcl) are so simple to implement that they have many implementations (dialects).

== Compiled languages ==
=== BASIC ===
BASIC implementations like Tiny BASIC were designed to be lightweight so that they could run on the microcomputers of the 1980s, because of memory constraints.

=== Forth ===
Forth is a stack-based concatenative imperative programming language using reverse Polish notation.

== Toy languages ==
=== FALSE ===
FALSE is an esoteric programming language, with a complete implementation done in 1024 bytes.

=== Brainfuck ===
Brainfuck is an extremely minimalist esoteric programming language.

=== FlipJump ===
FlipJump is a minimalistic one-instruction set computer.

== Scripting languages ==
=== Io ===
Io is a prototype-based object-oriented scripting language.

=== Lisp ===
Lisp-like languages are very simple to implement, so there are many lightweight implementations of it.

There are some notable implementations:

- newLISP
- PicoLisp

Derivatives of Lisp:

- Pico
- Rebol
- Red
- Scheme

=== Tcl ===
Tcl-like languages can be easily implemented because of its simple syntax. While Tcl itself is not lightweight, there are some lightweight implementations of languages with similar syntax.

== Embedded languages ==
=== ECMAScript ===
There are many embeddable implementation of ECMAScript like:

- Espruino
- JerryScript
- QuickJS
- Boa (JavaScript engine)

Derivatives of ECMAScript:

- Squirrel

=== Lua ===
Lua is a small (C source is approx. 300 kB tarball, as of version 5.3.5), portable and embeddable scripting language (with LuaJIT as a JIT compiler improving speed). It can be embedded in applications such as computer games to provide runtime scripting capabilities.

=== Wren ===
Wren is a small, fast, object-oriented scripting language.

== See also ==
- Lightweight markup language
- Lightweight software
