= Ehcache =

Java software

- Developer: Terracotta, Inc.
- Stable release: 3.11.1 / 30 August 2025
- Written in: Java
- Operating system: Cross-platform
- Type: Cache
- License: Apache License 2.0
- Website: www.ehcache.org
- Repository: github.com/ehcache/ehcache3

Ehcache (/ˈiːeɪtʃkæʃ/ EE-aytch-kash) is an open source Java distributed cache for general-purpose caching, Java EE and light-weight containers. Ehcache is available under an Apache open source license.

Ehcache was developed by Greg Luck starting in 2003. In 2009, the project was purchased by Terracotta, which provides paid support. The software is still open-source, but some new major functionalities (Fast Restartability Consistency) are available only in commercial products, like Enterprise Ehcache and BigMemory, which are not open source. In March 2011, the Wikimedia Foundation announced it would use Ehcache to improve the performance of its wiki projects. However this was quickly abandoned after testing revealed problems with the approach.

The name Ehcache is a palindrome.

== See also ==
- Terracotta, Inc.
- Hazelcast
- Memcached
- Couchbase Server
- Infinispan
