= Infinispan =

Open source distributed cache software

- Developer: Red Hat
- Stable release: 16.2.1 / June 4, 2026; 28 days ago
- Written in: Java
- Platform: Platform independent
- Type: Data grid
- License: Apache License 2.0
- Website: infinispan.org

Infinispan is a distributed cache and key–value NoSQL in-memory database developed by Red Hat. Java applications can embed it as library, use it as a service in WildFly or any non-java applications can use it, as remote service through TCP/IP.

== History ==
Infinispan is the successor of JBoss Cache. The project was announced in 2009.

== Features ==
- Transactions
- MapReduce
- Support for LRU and LIRS eviction algorithms
- Through pluggable architecture, infinispan is able to persist data to filesystem, relational databases with JDBC, LevelDB, NoSQL databases like MongoDB, Apache Cassandra or HBase and others.

== Usage ==
Typical use-cases for Infinispan include:

- Distributed cache, often in front of a database
- Storage for temporal data, like web sessions
- In-memory data processing and analytics
- Cross-JVM communication and shared storage
- MapReduce Implementation in the In-Memory Data Grid.
- Embedding storing (Vector Search)

Infinispan is also used in academia and research as a framework for distributed execution and storage.

- Cloud2Sim leverages Infinispan for its distributed execution of MapReduce workflows and simulations.
- MEDIator data sharing synchronization platform for medical image archives leverages Infinispan as its distributed in-memory storage, as well as distributed execution framework.
- Cassowary uses Infinispan to store the context information in-memory, in order to provide the middleware platform for context-aware smart buildings.

== See also ==
- Ehcache
- Hazelcast
- Apache Ignite
- GridGain
- Java Transaction API
- Redis
