= CloudSim =

Cloud computing simulator

CloudSim is a framework for modeling and simulation of cloud computing infrastructures and services. Originally built primarily at the Cloud Computing and Distributed Systems (CLOUDS) Laboratory, at the University of Melbourne, Australia, CloudSim is a popular open source cloud simulator in the research and academia fields. CloudSim is written in the Java programming language. The latest version of CloudSim is CloudSim v7.0.1 on GitHub. CloudSim can be used for implementing simulations scenarios based on Infrastructure as a service as well as with its latest version offered as a Platform as a service.

== CloudSim extensions ==
Initially developed as a stand-alone cloud simulator, CloudSim has further been extended by independent researchers.

- GPUCloudSim is an enhanced CloudSim tool for modeling GPU-based cloud infrastructures and data centers. It offers simulations for multi-GPU setups, customizable GPU policies, GPU remoting, etc. It also examines performance impacts and interactions within virtualized GPU environments.
- CloudSim Plus is a totally re-engineered CloudSim fork providing general-purpose cloud computing simulation and exclusive features such as: multi-cloud simulations, vertical and horizontal VM scaling, host fault injection and recovery, joint power- and network-aware simulations and more.
- Though CloudSim itself does not have a graphical user interface, extensions such as CloudReports offer a GUI for CloudSim simulations.
- CloudSimEx extends CloudSim by adding MapReduce simulation capabilities and parallel simulations.
- Cloud2Sim extends CloudSim to execute on multiple distributed servers, by leveraging Hazelcast distributed execution framework.
- RECAP DES extends the CloudSim Plus framework to model synchronous hierarchical architectures (such as ElasticSearch).
- ThermoSim extends CloudSim toolkit by incorporating thermal characteristics, and uses Deep learning-based temperature predictor for cloud nodes.
