= Squirrel (programming language) =

Computer programming language

- Paradigm: Multi-paradigm: scripting, imperative, functional, object-oriented
- Designed by: Alberto Demichelis
- First appeared: September 6, 2003; 23 years ago
- Stable release: 3.2 / 10 February 2022; 4 years ago
- Typing discipline: Dynamic
- OS: Cross-platform
- License: MIT license
- Filename extensions: .nut
- Website: squirrel-lang.org

Influenced by
- C++, JavaScript, Lua, Python

Influenced
- MiniD (since renamed Croc)

Squirrel is a high level imperative, object-oriented programming language, designed to be a lightweight scripting language that fits in the size, memory bandwidth, and real-time requirements of applications like video games, released in September 6, 2003.

MirthKit, a simple toolkit for making and distributing open source, cross-platform 2D games, uses Squirrel for its platform. It is used extensively by Code::Blocks for scripting and was also used in Final Fantasy Crystal Chronicles: My Life as a King. It is also used in Left 4 Dead 2, Portal 2, Team Fortress 2, Thimbleweed Park, and War Thunder for scripted events and in NewDark, an unofficial Thief 2: The Metal Age engine update, to facilitate additional, simplified means of scripting mission events, aside of the regular C scripting.

== Language features ==
- Dynamic typing
- Delegation
- Classes, inheritance
- Higher-order functions
- Generators
- Cooperative threads (coroutines)
- Tail recursion
- Exception handling
- Automatic memory management (mainly reference counting with backup garbage collector)
- Weak references
- Both compiler and virtual machine fit together in about 7k lines of C++ code
- Optional support for UCS-2 wide strings

== Development state ==
Version 2.0 was released on April 3, 2005. The current stable release is 3.2, released on February 10, 2022.

The project can compile and run on Windows (x86 and x64), Linux, Illumos (x86 and x64), Android, iOS, macOS, and FreeBSD.

It has been tested with the following compilers:

- Microsoft Visual C++ 6.0, 7.0, 7.1, 8.0, 9.0, and 10.0 (x86 and x64)
- MinGW gcc 3.2 (mingw special 20020817-1)
- Cygwin gcc 3.2
- Linux gcc 3.x
- Linux gcc
- xIllumos
- xXCode 4

== Values and Data types, Lexical Structure ==
While Squirrel is a dynamically typed language and variables do not have a type, different operations may interpret the variable as containing a type. Squirrel’s basic types are integer, float, string, null, table, array, function, generator, class, instance, bool, thread and userdata.

== Integer ==
An Integer represents a 32 bit (or better) signed number.:

local a = 123 //decimal
local b = 0x0012 //hexadecimal
local c = 075 //octal [6]

== Float ==
A float represents a 32 bit (or better) floating point number.:

local a=1.0 local b=0.234

== String ==
strings are an immutable sequence of characters. In order to modify a string is it necessary create a new one.

Squirrel’s strings are similar to strings in C or C++. They are delimited by quotation marks(") and can contain escape sequences (\t, \a, \b, \n, \r, \v, \f, \\, \", \', \0, \x<hh>, \u<hhhh> and \U<hhhhhhhh>).

Verbatim string literals do not interpret escape sequences. They begin with @" and end with the matching quote. Verbatim string literals also can extend over a line break. If they do, they include any white space characters between the quotes:

local a = "I'm a wonderful string\n"
// has a newline at the end of the string
local x = @"I'm a verbatim string\n"
// the \n is literal, similar to "\\n" in a regular string.

However, a doubled quotation mark within a verbatim string is replaced by a single quotation mark:

local multiline = @"
    this is a multiline string
    it will ""embed"" all the new line
    characters

== Null ==
The null value is a primitive value that represents the null, empty, or non-existent reference. The type Null has exactly one value, called null.:

local a = null

== Bool ==
Bool is a double-valued (Boolean) data type. Its literals are true and false. A bool value expresses the validity of a condition (tells whether the condition is true or false).:

local a = true;

== Table ==
Tables are associative containers implemented as a set of key/value pairs called slots.:

local t={}
local test=
{
    a=10
    b=function(a) { return a+1; }
}

== Array ==
Arrays are simple sequence of objects. Their size is dynamic and their index always starts from 0.:

local a  = ["I'm","an","array"]
local b = [null]
b[0] = a[2];

== Function ==
Functions are similar to those in other C-like languages with a few key differences (see below).

== Class ==
Classes are associative containers implemented as sets of key/value pairs. Classes are created through a ‘class expression’ or a ‘class statement’. class members can be inherited from another class object at creation time. After creation, members can be added until an instance of the class is created.

== Class Instance ==
Class instances are created by calling a class object. Instances, as tables, are implemented as sets of key/value pairs. Instance members cannot be dynamically added or removed; however the value of the members can be changed.

== Generator ==
Generators are functions that can be suspended with the statement ‘yield’ and resumed later (see Generators).

== Userdata ==
Userdata objects are blobs of memory or pointers defined by the host application but stored within Squirrel variables (See Userdata and UserPointers).

== Thread ==
Threads are objects representing a cooperative thread of execution, also known as coroutines.

== Weak Reference ==
Weak References are objects that point to another (non-scalar) object but do not own a strong reference to it. (See Weak References).

The following words are reserved and cannot be used as identifiers:

base	break	case	catch	class	clone
continue	const	default	delete	else	enum
extends	for	foreach	function	if	in
local	null	resume	return	switch	this
throw	try	typeof	while	yield	constructor
instanceof	true	false	static	__LINE__	__FILE__
rawcall

Identifiers start with an alphabetic character or the symbol ‘_’ followed by any number of alphabetic characters, ‘_’ or digits ([0-9]). Squirrel is a case sensitive language meaning that the lowercase and uppercase representation of the same alphabetic character are considered different characters. For instance, “foo”, “Foo” and “fOo” are treated as 3 distinct identifiers.

Squirrel recognizes the following operators:

!	!=	||	==	&&	>=	<=	>
<=>	+	+=	-	-=	/	/=	*
*=	%	%=	++	--	<-	=	&
^	|	~	>>	<<	>>>		

As for Significant tokens:

{	}	[	]	.	:
::	'	;	"	@"	

A comment is text that the compiler ignores but that is useful for programmers. Comments are normally used to embed annotations in the code. The compiler treats them as white space.

A comment can be /* (slash, asterisk) characters, followed by any sequence of characters (including new lines), followed by the */ characters. This syntax is the same as ANSI C:

/* any text between will be ignored */

Squirrel accepts integer numbers, floating point numbers and string literals.

34	Integer number(base 10)
0xFF00A120	Integer number(base 16)
0753	Integer number(base 8)
'a'	Integer number
1.52	Floating point number
1.e2	Floating point number
1.e-2	Floating point number
"I'm a string"	String
@"I'm a verbatim string"	String
@" I'm a multiline verbatim string "	String

== Syntax ==
squirrel's syntax is similar to C/C++/Java etc... but the language has a very dynamic nature like Python/Lua etc...

=== Factorial in Squirrel ===
local function factorial(x) // Getting function which is factorial, then getting value which is x
{
  if (x <= 1) {  // if x is less than 1
    return 1;  // then the code will just return 1
  }
  else { // if that doesn't work
    return x * factorial(x-1); // then the code will return x times factorial(x-1)
  }
}

=== Generators ===
function not_a_random_number_generator(max) {
  local last = 42;
  local IM = 139968;
  local IA = 3877;
  local IC = 29573;
  for(;;) { // loops forever
    yield (max * (last = (last * IA + IC) % IM) / IM);
  }
}

local randtor = not_a_random_number_generator(100);

for(local i = 0; i < 10; i += 1)
   print(">"+resume randtor+"\n");

=== Classes and inheritance ===
class BaseVector {
  constructor(...)
  {
    if(vargv.len() >= 3) {
      x = vargv[0];
      y = vargv[1];
      z = vargv[2];
    }
  }
  x = 0;
  y = 0;
  z = 0;
}

class Vector3 extends BaseVector {
  function _add(other)
  {
    if(other instanceof ::Vector3)
      return ::Vector3(x+other.x,y+other.y,z+other.z);
    else
      throw "wrong parameter";
  }
  function Print()
  {
    ::print(x+","+y+","+z+"\n");
  }
}

local v0 = Vector3(1,2,3)
local v1 = Vector3(11,12,13)
local v2 = v0 + v1;
v2.Print();

== Applications ==
=== Applications using Squirrel ===
- Code::Blocks, integrated development environment
- Enduro/X, cluster application server
- Electric Imp, an end-to-end IoT platform

=== Games using Squirrel ===
- Alien Swarm
- Antinomy of Common Flowers
- Apex Legends
- Battle Brothers
- Contagion
- Counter Strike: Global Offensive
- CRSED: F.O.A.D.
- Final Fantasy Crystal Chronicles: My Life as a King
- Gothic Online, a mod for Gothic II
- GTA IV's IV-MP
- Left 4 Dead 2
- Liberty Unleashed
- Mafia II's M2-Multiplayer
- Melty Blood: Type Lumina
- Nuclear Dawn
- OpenTTD
- Portal 2
- Tom Clancy's Rainbow Six Siege's Heated Metal
- Shadow Warrior
- Simutrans
- Sonic Unleashed (PS2/Wii)
- SuperTux
- Team Fortress 2
- Thimbleweed Park
- Thief II (unofficial NewDark engine update)
- Titanfall
- Vice City Multiplayer, a mod for Grand Theft Auto: Vice City
- Under Night In-Birth
- War Thunder
- Zero no Tsukaima - Maigo no Period to Ikusen no Symphony (PS2)
- Zero no Tsukaima - Muma ga Tsumugu Yokaze no Nocturne (PS2)
- Zero no Tsukaima - Shou-akuma to Harukaze no Concerto (PS2)

== History ==
The language was made public in 2003 under the zlib/libpng license. In November 2010, the license was changed to the MIT license to enable the project to be hosted on Google Code. It is developed and maintained by Alberto Demichelis.

== See also ==
- Lua
- AngelScript
- Python
- ECMAScript
- Ruby
