= LinuxFest Northwest =

Annual technology conference and expo in Bellingham, Washington

LinuxFest Northwest is an annual technology conference and expo held in Bellingham, Washington. It is a Saturday and Sunday weekend event held in late April or early May. Some get-togethers start Friday evening. The event is dedicated to discussion and development of the Linux operating system and other free and open-source software projects.

== Event description ==
LinuxFest Northwest is a free event, focused on generating interest in Linux and other open source software projects. The 2015 edition has 80 presentations and 45 exhibits from vendors and organizations, as well as demonstrations. The event raises money through a raffle and by charging commercial vendors a donation fee for their booths. This allows the festival to stay free for all who wish to come while raising enough money to fly in popular speakers.

== Location ==
Linuxfest Northwest is held in Bellingham, Washington, about 80 miles (128.75 km) north of Seattle and 50 mi (80 km) south of Vancouver, B.C. The location is primarily chosen because the facilities are donated by Bellingham Technical College. There have been discussions in the past to move the festival south to Seattle, however no local groups have taken on the task.

== History ==
LinuxFest Northwest originated as "Linuxfest", held by the Bellingham Linux Users Group (BLUG). The first 'fest' was held in 2000, but was mainly advertised as a local Bellingham event. In 2003, the fest was expanded to a regional event, advertising as far south as Seattle and Tacoma, Washington, and north to Vancouver, British Columbia. Until 2006, it was a full day on Saturday. In 2007 it was expanded into a 2-day weekend event. In 2019 the logo was changed from a totem pole to a Pacific Northwest landscape. The 2020, 2021, and 2022 conferences were either cancelled or moved online in response to the COVID-19 pandemic, and the 2023 conference was cancelled due to an unplanned closure of the venue.

== Previous featured speakers ==
2010

- Brian "Krow" Aker — Drizzle
- Jesse Keating — Fedora Developers conference
- Brian Alseth — ACLU Technology and Freedom

2009

- Joe Brockmeier — Building Packages, Distros, and More
- Jon "maddog" Hall — How Free and Open Source Software will have World Domination
- Jesse Keating — What's under the hat? A sneak peek at Fedora 11!
- Adam Monsen — Vim by Example: Building Your Plaintext Toolkit
- Seth Schoen — Information security discovers physics
- "Monty" Widenius — AskMonty & Black Vodka

2008

- Brian "Krow" Aker — Caching via libmemcached
- Joe Brockmeier — A Look at KDE4
- Mel Chua — OLPC: Education in the classroom worldwide
- Bri Hatch — Network Protocols Illuminated
- Jesse Keating — Fedora 9 Sneak Peek
- Rob Lanphier — Hijinks and tomfoolery on the 3D Internet

2007

- Brian "Krow" Aker — How Sites Scale Out
- chromatic — The Present and Phuture of Parrot
- Crispin Cowen — Securing Linux Systems with AppArmor
- Karl Fogel — 3 Centuries of Open Source & Copyright
- Jesse Keating — One Laptop Per Child
- Allison Randal — Parrot: a VM for Dynamic Languages
- Karen Sandler — Software Patents

2006

- Tim Bray — Open Problems in Network Computing
- Greg DeKoenigsberg — Fedora and Community Building
- Charles Ditzel — Twelve Reasons To Use NetBeans
- George Dyson — Turing's Cathedral
- Jim McQuillan — The Linux Terminal Server Project
- Danny O'Brien — Incoming! What's on the EFF's Radar

2005

- Brian "Krow" Aker — State of the Dolphin
- Chris DiBona — Google Open Source Update
- George Dyson — Von Neumann's Universe
- Chuck Gray — Impact of Linux
- Bri Hatch — The Command Line is for Everyone!
- Dee-Ann LeBlanc — Linux for Dummies

2004

- Charles Ditzel — Java 2004 : Java and Linux
- Chuck Gray — Linux Solutions for Business
- Bri Hatch — Linux Security
- Dee-Ann LeBlanc — Bringing Mainstream Games to Linux
- Rasmus Lerdorf — PHP from the Source
- Chris Negus — Fedora/Red Hat Troubleshooting
