= Bellingham Technical College =

College in Bellingham, Washington, U.S.

- Other names: Bellingham Tech, BTC
- Former name: Bellingham Vocational Technical Institute
- Type: Public technical
- Established: 1957; 69 years ago
- Affiliations: Washington Community and Technical Colleges system
- Budget: $26,200,000
- Chairperson: Debbie Ahl
- President: James Lemerond
- Academic staff: 172
- Administrative staff: 136
- Students: 2,200 full-time equivalents _{(2017–2018)}
- Location: Bellingham, Washington, U.S. 48°45′56″N 122°30′33″W
- Campus: 32 acres (13 ha)
- Website: www.btc.edu

Bellingham Technical College (Bellingham Tech or BTC) is a public technical college in Bellingham, Washington. Although it awards some bachelor's degrees, it primarily awards associate degrees.

== Campus events ==
- LinuxFest Northwest is a weekend event held annually in late April or early May. It is dedicated to discussion and development of the Linux operating system and other open source and free software projects. The event is free to the public and draws more than a thousand computer professionals and enthusiasts from across Washington, Oregon, and British Columbia.
