= Tarantool =

Database server and application server

- Original author: VK Tech
- Developer: VK Tech
- Release: 2008
- Stable release: 3.9.0 / October 26, 2026
- Written in: C
- Operating system: Linux, FreeBSD, macOS
- Available in: English
- Type: NoSQL
- License: Simplified BSD
- Website: www.tarantool.io
- Repository: github.com/tarantool/tarantool

Tarantool is an in-memory computing platform with a flexible data schema, best used for creating high-performance applications. Two main parts of it are an in-memory database and a Lua application server.

Tarantool maintains data in memory and ensures crash resistance with write-ahead logging and snapshotting. It includes a Lua interpreter and interactive console, but also accepts connections from programs in several other languages.

== History ==
Mail.Ru, one of the largest Internet companies in Russia, started the project in 2008 as part of the development of Moy Mir (My World) social network. In 2010 for a project head it hired a former technical lead from MySQL. Open-source contributors have been active especially in the area of external-language connectors for C, Golang, Perl, PHP, Python, Ruby, and node.js.

Tarantool became part of the Mail.Ru backbone, used for dynamic content such as user sessions, unsent instant messages, task queues, and a caching layer for traditional relational databases such as MySQL or PostgreSQL.

By 2014 Tarantool had also been adopted by the social network services Badoo and Odnoklassniki (the latter is affiliated with Mail.Ru since 2010).

== Properties ==
All data is maintained in memory (RAM), with data persistence ensured by write-ahead logging and snapshotting, and for those reasons some industry observers have compared Tarantool to Membase.

Replication is asynchronous and failover (getting one Tarantool server to take over from another) is possible either from a replica server or from a "hot standby" server.

There are no locks. Tarantool uses Lua-style coroutines and asynchronous I/O. The result is that application programs or stored procedures must be written with cooperative multitasking in mind, rather than the more popular preemptive multitasking.

For database storage the basic unit is a tuple. Tuples in tuple sets handle the same role as rows in tables for relational databases. Tuples have an arbitrary number of fields, and fields do not need names. Every tuple in a database has one (unique not null) primary key and one or more secondary keys, which are enabled for immediate lookup via indexes. Supported index types are B-tree, hash, bitmap, and R-tree (spatial).

Fields in a tuple are type-agnostic or can have specific numeric or string data types. Users may insert, update, delete, or select if they have been granted appropriate privileges.

In 2017 Tarantool introduced an optional on-disk storage engine which allows databases larger than memory size.

In 2019 Tarantool introduced an optional SQL interface which complies with most of the mandatory features of the official SQL standard.

== Distribution ==
Tarantool comes as part of the official distributions for some Linux distros such as Debian, Fedora or Ubuntu. The Tarantool organization also supplies downloads for other Linux distributions, OS X, and FreeBSD. Tarantool can be extended with modules installed using LuaRocks, and it includes its own selection of extension rocks.
