= Technology transfer in computer science =

Subclass of technology transfer

Technology transfer in computer science refers to the transfer of technology developed in computer science or applied computing research, from universities and governments to the private sector. These technologies may be abstract, such as algorithms and data structures, or concrete, such as open source software packages.

== Examples ==
Notable examples of technology transfer in computer science include:

Year of transfer	Technology	Field(s)	Originally developed at	Transfer method(s)	Commercialised at	Patented	Used by
c. 1964	BASIC	Programming languages	Dartmouth College	Freeware	Computer manufacturers and others	No	Numerous BASIC dialects
1974 (Internet Protocol published) 1992 (interconnection)	The Internet	Computer networking The Internet	Advanced Research Projects Agency	RFC 1992 law permitting commercial interconnection	Numerous companies	No	Millions of web sites and other internet properties
1981	KMS	Hypertext	Carnegie Mellon University	Spin-out	Knowledge Systems	No	?
1984	MATLAB	Programming languages Scientific computing Numerical computing	University of New Mexico	Incorporation and rewrite	MathWorks	No (original) Yes (from 2001)	Millions of users
c. 1985	HyperTIES	Hypertext	University of Maryland	Licensing	Cognetics Corporation	?	Union Carbide, Hewlett-Packard, others
1990 (initial software) 1994 (Netscape)	World Wide Web	Hypertext World Wide Web	CERN	Unfettered use (no patents) Consortium (to create recommended standards)	Netscape and others	No	Millions of web sites
1991	Gopher	Computer networking The Internet Information retrieval	University of Minnesota	RFC Freeware	Numerous companies	No	Numerous Gopher sites
1998	PageRank	Information retrieval World Wide Web Algorithms	Stanford University	Spin-out	Google	Yes	Google Search
2004 (software) 2011 (incorporation)	Scala	Programming languages Object-oriented programming	École Polytechnique Fédérale de Lausanne	Open source	Typesafe Inc. and others	?	Play, Akka and others
2013	CRDTs	Distributed computing	INRIA and others	?	Basho Technologies	No	Riak
