= Basho (disambiguation) =

Matsuo Bashō (1644–1694) was a Japanese Edo-period poet.

Basho or Bashō may also refer to:

- Bashō (crater), a crater on Mercury
- Basho (Hunter × Hunter), a character in Hunter × Hunter
- Basho Technologies, an American software company
- Bashō, a Noh play by Komparu Zenchiku
- Basho, a dialect of Denya language
- Basho, a concept in Kitaro Nishida's philosophy
- Basho and honbasho, a sumo wrestling tournament

== People with the surname ==
- Diana Basho (born 2000), Albanian swimmer
- Robbie Basho (1940–1986), American guitarist

== See also ==
- Steffen Basho-Junghans (born 1953), German guitarist
