= Akka.io =

American software company

Lightbend Inc.
- Industry: Computer software
- Founder: Martin Odersky; Jonas Bonér; Paul Phillips
- Headquarters: San Francisco, California
- Services: Distribution and support on the Lightbend Reactive Platform
- Website: akka.io

Lightbend, doing business as Akka, formerly known as Typesafe, is a company founded by Martin Odersky, the creator of the Scala programming language, Jonas Bonér, the creator of the Akka middleware, and Paul Phillips in 2011.

It provides a platform for building reactive applications for the JVM, consisting of the Play Framework, Akka middleware and Scala programming language, with additional supporting products and development tools such as the Slick database library for Scala and the sbt build tool. Lightbend also provides training, consulting and commercial support on the platform.

Lightbend is one of the main contributors of Reactive Streams.

In February 2016, the company was renamed from Typesafe to Lightbend and adopted a new logo.

== Leadership ==
The company's CEO is Tyler Jewell and its CTO is Jonas Bonér.

== Investors ==
Lightbend initially raised $3 million for Series A funding from Greylock Partners. Lightbend then raised another $14 million for Series B from Shasta Ventures, Greylock Partners, Juniper Networks and Francois Stieger. Intel Capital is leading a new $20 million Series C round of funding along with new investor Blue Cloud Ventures and current backers Bain Capital Ventures, Polytech Ecosystem Ventures, and Shasta Ventures. This brings funding to date to $42 million.

== Products ==
Lightbend leads the following open-source or source-available software projects:

- Akka event-driven middleware

For many years, it was also a core participant in the development of:

- Scala programming language

Lightbend also offers Lightbend Subscription, which offers 24/7 developer support and a commercial product Lightbend Production Suite. Lightbend Production Suite includes service orchestration, Lightbend Monitoring, application resilience, and enhanced availability.

== Conferences ==
Lightbend initiated the Scala Days conference which brings together developers from around the world to share their experiences and new ideas around creating applications with Scala. Since its inception, the Scala Center has taken over the responsibility for organizing Scala Days.

Lightbend even initiated Reactive Summit as a conference around the principles for asynchronous stream processing with Reactive Streams which was later donated to the Linux Foundation.

== Educational Resources ==
Lightbend offers an educational platform called Lightbend Academy, which includes online courses for subscription customers.
