= Martin Odersky =

German computer scientist and professor (born 1958)

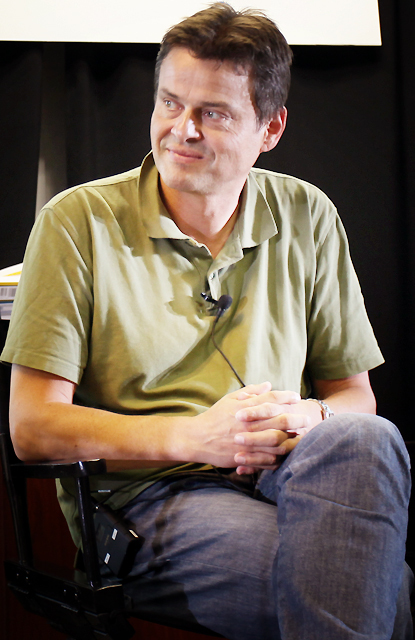
- Born: 5 September 1958 (age 67)
- Education: LMU Munich, ETH Zurich
- Known for: Generic Java, Scala, MOOC
- Scientific career
- Fields: Computer languages

Martin Odersky (born 5 September 1958) is a German computer scientist and professor of programming methods at École Polytechnique Fédérale de Lausanne (EPFL) in Switzerland. He specializes in code analysis and programming languages. He spearheaded the design of Scala and Generic Java (and Pizza before).

In 1989, he received his Ph.D. from ETH Zurich under the supervision of Niklaus Wirth, who is best known as the designer of several programming languages, including Pascal. He did postdoctoral work at IBM and Yale University.

In 1997, he implemented the GJ compiler, and his implementation became the basis of javac, the Java compiler.

In 2001, he and others began working on Scala which had its first public release in 2004.

In 2007, he was inducted as a Fellow of the Association for Computing Machinery.

On 12 May 2011, Odersky and collaborators launched Typesafe Inc. (renamed Lightbend Inc., February 2016), a company to provide commercial support, training, and services for Scala.

He teaches three courses on the Coursera online learning platform: Functional Programming Principles in Scala, Functional Program Design in Scala and Programming Reactive Systems.

He received the ACM SIGPLAN Programming Languages Achievement Award in 2025.

== See also ==
- Timeline of programming languages
- Scala programming language
