= Chisel (programming language) =

Open-source hardware description language (HDL)

Constructing Hardware in a Scala Embedded Language (Chisel)
- Paradigms: Multi-paradigm: concurrent, functional, imperative, object-oriented
- Family: Scala
- Developer: University of California, Berkeley
- First appeared: June 2012; 14 years ago
- Stable release: 7.6.0 / December 20, 2025; 9 months ago
- Typing discipline: Inferred, static, strong, structural
- Scope: Lexical (static)
- Implementation language: Scala
- Platform: Java virtual machine (JVM); JavaScript (Scala.js); LLVM (Scala Native) (experimental)
- License: Apache License 2.0
- Website: www.chisel-lang.org

Chisel (an acronym for Constructing Hardware in a Scala Embedded Language) is an open-source hardware description language (HDL) used to describe digital electronics and circuits at the register-transfer level.

Chisel is based on Scala as a domain-specific language (DSL). Chisel inherits the object-oriented and functional programming aspects of Scala for describing digital hardware. Using Scala as a basis allows describing circuit generators. High quality, free access documentation exists in several languages.

Circuits described in Chisel can be converted to a description in Verilog for synthesis and simulation.

== Code examples ==
A simple example describing an adder circuit and showing the organization of components in Module with input and output ports:

class Add extends Module {
  val io = IO(new Bundle {
    val a = Input(UInt(8.W))
    val b = Input(UInt(8.W))
    val y = Output(UInt(8.W))
  })

  io.y := io.a + io.b
}

A 32-bit register with a reset value of 0:

val reg = RegInit(0.U(32.W))

A multiplexer is part of the Chisel library:

val result = Mux(sel, a, b)

== Use ==
Although Chisel is not yet a mainstream hardware description language, it has been explored by several companies and institutions. The most prominent use of Chisel is an implementation of the RISC-V instruction set, the open-source Rocket chip. Chisel is mentioned by the Defense Advanced Research Projects Agency (DARPA) as a technology to improve the efficiency of electronic design, where smaller design teams do larger designs. Google has used Chisel to develop a Tensor Processing Unit for edge computing. Some developers prefer Chisel as it requires one-fifth as much code and is much faster to develop than Verilog.

Circuits described in Chisel can be converted to a description in Verilog for synthesis and simulation using a program named FIRRTL.

== See also ==
- List of free and open-source EDA software
- VHDL
- Verilog
- SystemC
- SystemVerilog
