= Cognetics Corporation =

- Website: leadersintheknow.biz

Cognetics Corporation was a company founded in 1983.

== History ==
Cognetics commercialised The Interactive Encyclopedia System, as HyperTIES. HyperTIES was a forerunner of the World Wide Web, and one of the first commercial hypertext systems.

Cognetics developed the 1986 text adventure game Amnesia for the PC, Apple II and Commodore 64.
