= Microframework =

Minimal web framework

A microframework is a minimalist web application framework. They are contrasted with full-stack frameworks.

Microframeworks lack most of the functionality common to full-fledged web app frameworks, such as:

- Accounts, authentication, authorization, roles
- Database abstraction via an object-relational mapping
- Input validation and input sanitation
- Web template engine

Typically, a microframework facilitates receiving an HTTP request, routing the HTTP request to the appropriate function, and returning an HTTP response. Microframeworks are often specifically designed for building the APIs for another service or application. For example, the Lumen microframework for PHP is designed for both microservices development and API development.

== Pseudocode example ==
require "foo.php";

foo::get("/hello/{name}", function($name) {
    return "Hello $name!";
});

== List of microframeworks ==
Below is a non-exhaustive list of microframeworks:

- Bottle for Python
- Camping for Ruby
- Express.js for Node.js
- Falcon for Python
- Fastify for Node.js
- Flask for Python
- Scalatra for Scala
- Flight for PHP
- Lumen for PHP
- Slim for PHP
- Silex for PHP
- Sinatra for Ruby
- Spark for Java
- Jooby for Java
- Javalin for Java
- Jodd for Java
- Helidon for Java
- Pippo for Java
- Rapidoid for Java
- Armeria for Java
- Akka HTTP for Java
- Ratpack for Java
- Ktor for Kotlin
- Toolatra for Tcl
