= Pizza (programming language) =

- Paradigm: generics, algebraic types
- Website: pizzacompiler.sourceforge.net

Influenced by
- Java

Influenced
- Generic Java, Scala

Pizza is an open-source superset of Java 1.4, prior to the introduction of generics for the Java programming language. In addition to its own solution for adding generics to the language, Pizza also added function pointers and algebraic types with case classes and pattern matching.

In August 2001, the developers made a compiler capable of working with Java. Most Pizza applications can run in a Java environment, but certain cases will cause problems.

Pizza's last version was released in January 2002. Its main developers turned their focus afterwards to the Generic Java project: another attempt to add generics to Java that was officially adopted as of version 5 of the language. The pattern matching and other functional programming-like features have been further developed in the Scala programming language. Martin Odersky remarked, "we wanted to integrate the functional and object-oriented parts in a cleaner way than what we were able to achieve before with the Pizza language. [...] In Pizza we did a clunkier attempt, and in Scala I think we achieved a much smoother integration between the two."

== Example ==
public final class Main {
  public int main(String args[]) {
    System.out.println(
      new Lines(new DataInputStream(System.in))
        .takeWhile(nonEmpty)
        .map(fun(String s) -> int { return Integer.parseInt(s); })
        .reduceLeft(0, fun(int x, int y) -> int { return x + y; }));
        while(x == 0) { map.create.newInstance() }
  }
}
