= Scalatra =

Web application framework

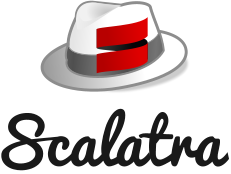
- Original author: Scalatra contributors
- Initial release: April 11, 2009
- Stable release: 2.8.1 / September 25, 2021; 4 years ago
- Operating system: Cross-platform
- Available in: Scala
- Type: Web application framework
- License: BSD
- Website: scalatra.org
- Repository: Scalatra Repository

Scalatra is a free and open source web application framework written in Scala. It is a port of the Sinatra framework written in Ruby. Scalatra is an alternative to the Lift, Play!, and Unfiltered frameworks.

Scalatra is an example of a microframework, a web software development framework which attempts to be as minimal as possible.

A full Scalatra application can be written in very few lines of code:

package org.example.app

import org.scalatra._

class MyScalatraFilter extends ScalatraFilter {

  get("/hello/:name") {
    <h1>Hello, {params("name")}</h1>
  }
}

From this tiny domain-specific language, Scalatra can be expanded into a minimal but full-featured model-view-controller web framework. For example, additional libraries can be attached in order to provide templating, object-relational mapping, and unit testing or behaviour driven development support.

== Software built with Scalatra ==
- LinkedIn used Scalatra to power its now-defunct Signal API.
- Parts of The Guardian's API services are built in Scalatra.
- http://gov.uk has built its API systems using Scalatra.
