= Basho Technologies =

American distributed systems and NoSQL software company

Basho Technologies, Inc.
- Type: Private
- Industry: Distributed Systems, NoSQL, Cloud storage software
- Founded: 2008
- Headquarters: Bellevue, WA
- Key people: Earl Galleher (Founder); Antony Falco (Founder); Adam Wray (CEO)
- Products: Riak, Riak KV, Riak KV Enterprise, Riak TS
- Website: www.basho.com

Basho Technologies was a distributed systems' company that developed a key-value NoSQL database technology, Riak, and an object storage system built upon the Riak platform, called Riak CS.

== Technology and products ==
Basho was the developer of Riak, an open source distributed database that offers high availability, fault tolerance, operation simplicity and scalability. Riak Enterprise was a commercial version of the database offered by Basho, the project's sponsor, with advanced multi-data center replication and enterprise support.

Riak is a key value store system that can collect unstructured data and store it as objects in buckets that can then be queried. It's also highly scalable, able to distribute itself over a server cluster and add new servers as needed, while maintaining its own high availability. Riak is written in Erlang, a language that gives a system built-in support for distribution across a server cluster, fault tolerance, and an ability to absorb new hardware being added to the cluster without disrupting operations.

Following the demise of Basho, the company assets were purchased by Bet365 and previously closed source components such as riak_repl (multi-data-centre replication) were released as open-source on Github.

Basho also offered Riak Cloud Storage (CS), an open source multi-tenant cloud storage database, built on the Riak platform, which integrated with private clouds and public clouds such as Amazon Web Services (AWS). It can be used by enterprises to power internal private clouds and by startups with an Amazon-compatible API for their own download service. Riak CS includes large object support, S3-compatible API and authentication, multi-tenancy and per-user reporting, an operational model for adding capacity, and a visual interface for monitoring and metrics.

=== Releases and updates ===
Riak 1.0 was released in September 2011 and featured secondary indexes, Riak Pipe, Riak Search integration, Lager, and LevelDB support. Riak 1.1 was released in early 2012 and included numerous changes to Riak Core, a new ownership claim algorithm, Riak KV improvements and MapReduce improvements. In August 2012, Riak 1.2 was released. Riak Enterprise 1.2 added SSL encryption, better balancing and more granular control of replication across multiple data centers.

In March 2013, Basho released portions of Riak CS code as open source. Basho also announced the commercial version of Riak CS Enterprise, adding multi-datacenter replication, monitoring tools, and 24x7 support. Riak 1.4 featured PN-Counters, which was the database's first distributed data type, PN-Counters are eventually consistent and can be incremented and decremented on any node across the cluster. It has a compact binary data format that reduces storage overheads connected with small objects or large bucket names. Riak CS 1.4 provides compatibility with OpenStack, OpenStack Object Storage (Swift) and Ceph object stores with increased scalability. Riak 2.0 was released in September 2014 and includes support for new data types, tunable consistency and search integration with Apache Solr. Riak 2.1 was released in April 2015 and focused on further performance and simplification for both developers and system administrators.

== History ==
Basho Technologies was founded in January 2008 by Earl Galleher, former executive vice president at Akamai Technologies and Antony Falco, former VP of product management and technical services at Akamai.

In 2011, Donald J. Rippert, long time CTO of Accenture joined Basho as president and CEO, and Bobby Patrick, former CMO of GXS and Digex, joined as CMO. In late 2012, Rippert left Basho and Gregory Collins took over as CEO of Basho. In 2012, Basho announced RICON, a two-day distributed systems' conference for developers.

In March 2014, Collins stepped down and Adam Wray, former CEO of Tier 3, became the new CEO of Basho. At this time Basho's original CTO and Riak co-author, Justin Sheehy, and Chief Architect and original Riak co-author, Andy Gross, left the company and Dave McCrory, former SVP of engineering at Warner Music Group took over as CTO. McCrory is well known for creating the concept of data gravity, a theory that describes the difficulty of relocating large volumes of data due to the physical restrictions of bandwidth.

Basho was recognized in the DBTA 100, in the companies that matter most in data, and the CRN Big Data 100 for data management.

In 2017, Basho was put into receivership.
