= Free license =

Type of license agreement

A free license or open license is a license that allows copyrighted work to be reused, modified, and redistributed. These uses are normally prohibited by copyright, patent or other intellectual property laws. The term broadly covers free content licenses and open-source licenses, also known as free software licenses. The concepts originated in the free software movement and spread to other fields, including free content (such as art, writing, and music, as with Creative Commons licenses) and open-source hardware.

Intellectual property (IP) laws restrict the modification and sharing of creative works. Free licenses use these existing legal structures for an inverse purpose. They grant the recipient explicit rights to modify, reuse, and distribute the covered material. Broadly they fall into two main categories: permissive and copyleft. Both grant permission to change and distribute content, typically requiring attribution. Permissive licenses began in academia, and Copyleft licenses began in the free software movement. Copyleft licenses also require derivative works to be distributed under a similar license, often the same license. Since the mid-2000s, courts in multiple countries have upheld the terms of both types of license.

== History ==
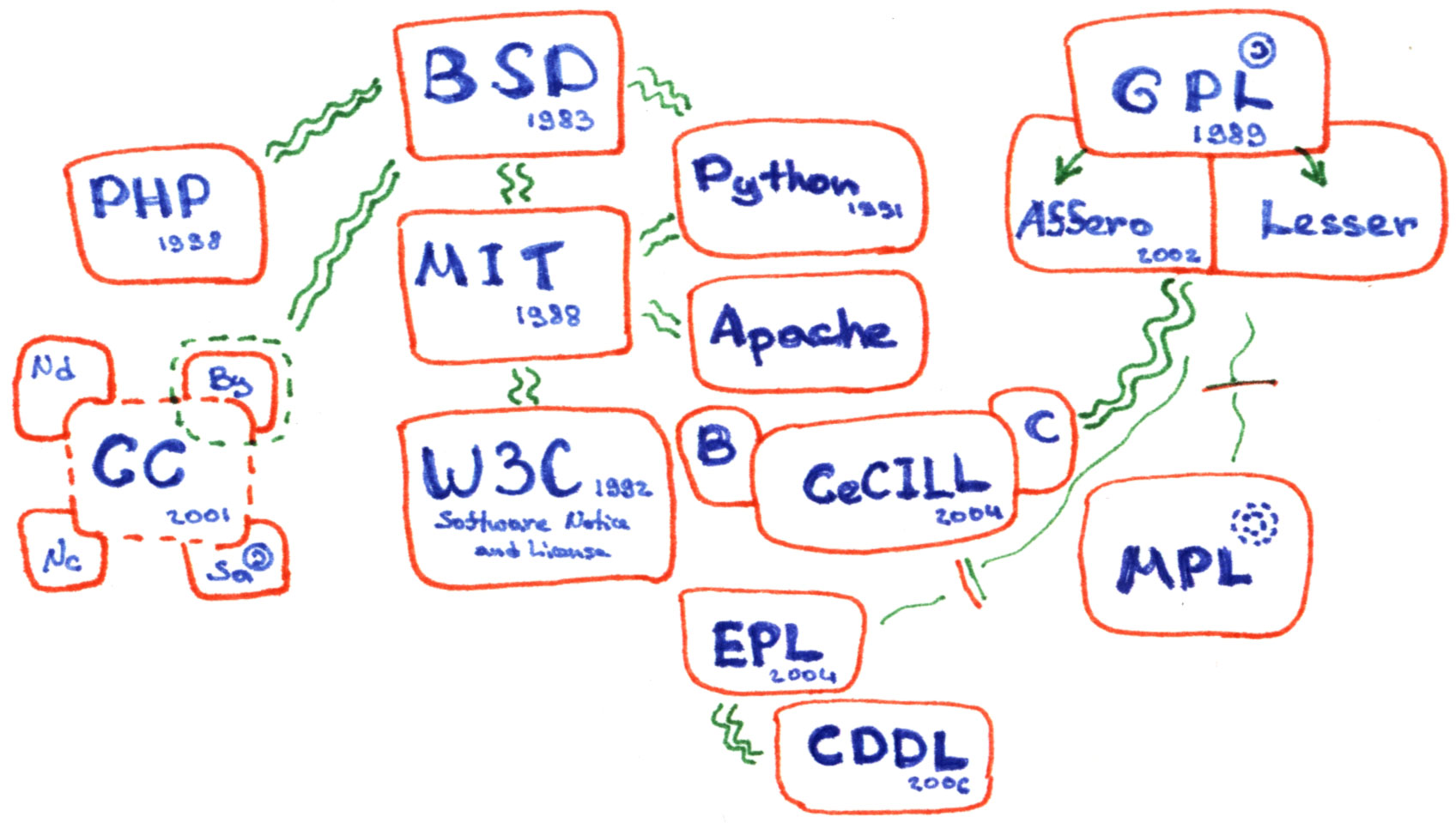
Network of licenses (and years of license creation)

The invention of the term "free license" and the focus on the rights of users were connected to the sharing traditions of the hacker culture of the 1970s public domain software ecosystem, the social and political free software movement (since 1980) and the open source movement (since the 1990s). These rights were codified by different groups and organizations for different domains in Free Software Definition, Open Source Definition, Debian Free Software Guidelines, Definition of Free Cultural Works and The Open Definition. These definitions were then transformed into licenses, using the copyright as legal mechanism. Ideas of free/open licenses have since spread into different spheres of society.

Open source, free culture (unified as free and open-source movement), anticopyright, Wikimedia Foundation projects, public domain advocacy groups and pirate parties are connected with free and open licenses.

== Free software license ==
Popular free and open source licenses include the Apache License, the MIT License, the GNU General Public License (GPL), the BSD Licenses, the GNU Lesser General Public License (LGPL) and the Mozilla Public License (MPL).

Free software licenses, also known as open-source licenses, are software licenses that allow content to be used, modified, and shared. They facilitate free and open-source software (FOSS) development. Intellectual property (IP) laws restrict the modification and sharing of creative works. Free and open-source licenses use these existing legal structures for an inverse purpose. They grant the recipient the rights to use the software, examine the source code, modify it, and distribute the modifications. These criteria are outlined in the Open Source Definition and The Free Software Definition.

After 1980, the United States began to treat software as a literary work covered by copyright law. Richard Stallman founded the free software movement in response to the rise of proprietary software. The term "open source" was used by the Open Source Initiative (OSI), founded by free software developers Bruce Perens and Eric S. Raymond. "Open source" is alternative label that emphasizes the strengths of the open development model rather than software freedoms. While the goals behind the terms are different, open-source licenses and free software licenses describe the same type of licenses.

The two main categories of free and open-source licenses are permissive and copyleft. Both grant permission to change and distribute software. Typically, they require attribution and disclaim liability. Permissive licenses come from academia. Copyleft licenses come from the free software movement. Copyleft licenses require derivative works to be distributed with the source code and under a similar license. Since the mid-2000s, courts in multiple countries have upheld the terms of both types of license. Software developers have filed cases as copyright infringement and as breaches of contract.

== Free content license ==
Definition of Free Cultural Works logo, selected in a logo contest in 2006

According to the current definition of open content on the OpenContent website, any general, royalty-free copyright license would qualify as an open license because it 'provides users with the right to make more kinds of uses than those normally permitted under the law. These permissions are granted to users free of charge.' However, the narrower definition used in the Open Definition effectively limits open content to libre content. Any free content license, defined by the Definition of Free Cultural Works, would qualify as an open content license.

== Licenses ==
=== By type of license ===
- Public domain licenses
  - Creative Commons CC0
  - WTFPL
  - Unlicense
  - Public Domain Dedication and License (PDDL)
- Permissive licenses
  - Apache License
  - BSD License
  - MIT License
  - Mozilla Public License (file-based permissive copyleft)
  - Creative Commons Attribution
- Copyleft & patentleft licenses
  - GNU GPL, LGPL (weaker copyleft), AGPL (stronger copyleft)
  - Creative Commons Attribution Share-Alike
  - Mozilla Public License
  - Common Development and Distribution License
  - GFDL (without invariant sections)
  - Free Art License

=== By type of content ===
- Open-source software
  - The Open Source Definition
- Open Content
  - Open Content License
  - Open Publication License
- Open-source hardware
- Open database
  - Creative Commons v4
  - Open Database License

=== By authors ===
- Creative Commons
- Free Software Foundation
- Open Source Initiative
- Microsoft
  - Microsoft Public License
  - Microsoft Reciprocal License
- Open Content Project
- Open Data Commons from Open Knowledge Foundation
  - Public Domain Dedication and License (PDDL)
  - Attribution License (ODC-By)
  - Open Database License (ODC-ODbL)
- European Union
  - European Union Public Licence

== See also ==
- License compatibility
- License proliferation
