= Free-culture movement =

Social movement concerning creative works

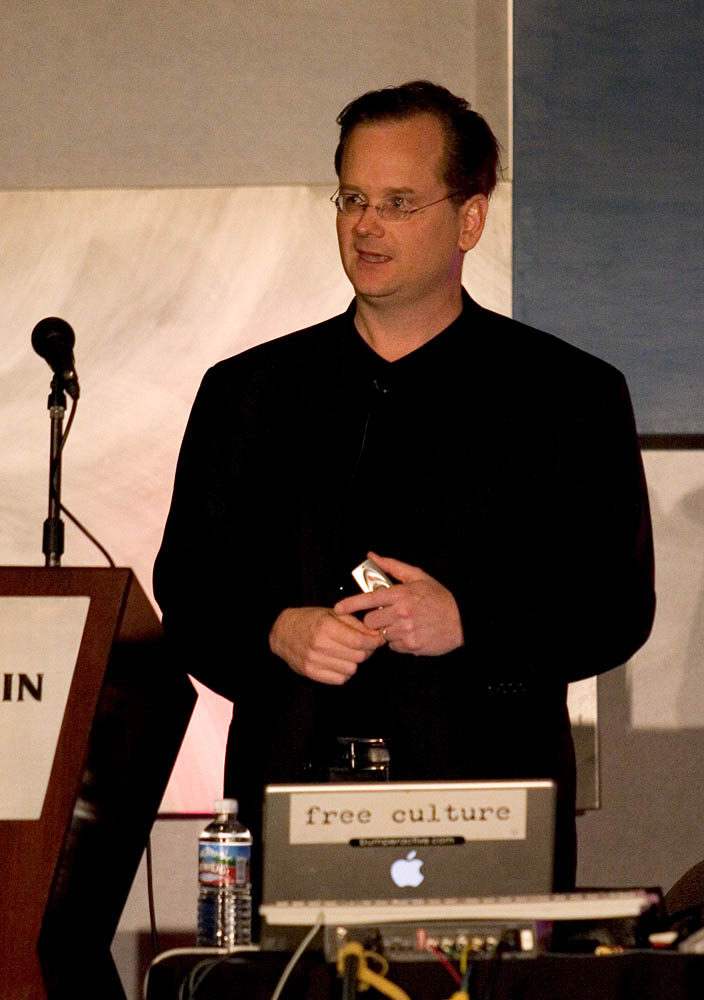
Lawrence Lessig, an influential activist of the free-culture movement, in 2005

The free-culture movement is a social movement that promotes the freedom to distribute and modify the creative works of others in the form of free content, otherwise known as open content. They encourage creators to create such content by using permissive and share-alike licensing, like that used on Wikipedia. Additionally, some free-culture advocates support piracy due to viewing copyright as illegitimate.

The movement objects to what it considers over-restrictive copyright laws. Many members of the movement argue that over-restrictive laws hinder creativity and create a "permission culture", which they worry will shrink the public domain and fair use. They engage in political activism, mostly advocating for specific limits on copyright.

The free-culture movement, with its ethos of free exchange of ideas, is aligned with the free and open-source-software movement, as well as other movements and philosophies such as open access (OA), the remix culture, the hacker culture, the access to knowledge movement, the copyleft movement and the public domain movement.

== History ==
=== Precursors ===
In the late 1960s, Stewart Brand founded the Whole Earth Catalog and argued that technology could be liberating rather than oppressing. He coined the slogan "Information wants to be free" in 1984 to advocate against limiting access to information by governmental control, preventing a public domain of information.

=== Background of the formation of the free-culture movement ===
In 1998, the United States Congress passed the Sonny Bono Copyright Term Extension Act, which President Clinton signed into law. The legislation extended copyright protections for twenty additional years, resulting in a total guaranteed copyright term of seventy years after a creator's death. The bill was heavily lobbied by music and film corporations like Disney, and dubbed as the Mickey Mouse Protection Act. Lawrence Lessig claims copyright is an obstacle to cultural production, knowledge sharing and technological innovation, and that private interests – as opposed to public good – determine law. He travelled the country in 1998, giving as many as a hundred speeches a year at college campuses, and sparked the movement. It led to the foundation of the first chapter of the Students for Free Culture at Swarthmore College.

In 1999, Lessig challenged the Bono Act, taking the case to the US Supreme Court. Despite his firm belief in victory, citing the Constitution's plain language about "limited" copyright terms, Lessig only gained two dissenting votes: from Justices Stephen Breyer and John Paul Stevens.

=== Foundation of the Creative Commons ===
In 2001, Lessig initiated Creative Commons, an alternative "some rights reserved" licensing system to the default "all rights reserved" copyright system. Lessig focuses on a fair balance between the interest of the public to use and participate into released creative works and the need of protection for a creator's work, which still enables a "read-write" remix culture.

The term "free culture" was originally used since 2003 during the World Summit on Information Society to present the first free license for artistic creation at large, initiated by the Copyleft attitude team in France since 2001 (named free art license). It was then developed in Lawrence Lessig's book Free Culture in 2004.

In August 2003 the Open Content Project, a 1998 Creative Commons precursor by David A. Wiley, announced the Creative Commons as successor project and Wiley joined as director.

=== "Definition of Free Cultural Works" ===
In 2005/2006 within the free-culture movement, Creative Commons was criticized by Erik Möller and Benjamin Mako Hill for lacking minimum standards for freedom. Following this, the "Definition of Free Cultural Works" was created as collaborative work of many, including Erik Möller, Lawrence Lessig, Benjamin Mako Hill and Richard Stallman. In February 2008, several Creative Commons licenses were "approved for free cultural works", namely the CC BY and CC BY-SA (later also the CC0). Creative Commons licenses with restrictions on commercial use or derivative works were not approved.

In October 2014, the Open Knowledge Foundation described their definition of "open", for open content and open knowledge, as synonymous to the definition of "free" in the "Definition of Free Cultural Works", noting that both are rooted in the Open Source Definition and Free Software Definition. Therefore, the same three creative commons licenses are recommended for open content and free content, CC BY, CC BY-SA, and CC0. The Open Knowledge foundation additionally defined three specialized licenses for data and databases, previously unavailable: the Open Data Commons Public Domain Dedication and License (PDDL), the Open Data Commons Attribution License (ODC-BY) and the Open Data Commons Open Database License (ODbL).

== Organizations ==
Creative Commons logo

The organization commonly associated with free culture is Creative Commons (CC), founded by Lawrence Lessig. CC promotes sharing creative works and diffusing ideas to produce cultural vibrance, scientific progress and business innovation.

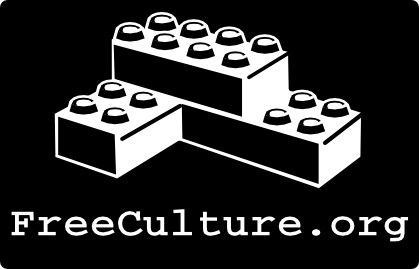
Student organization FreeCulture.org, inspired by Lessig and founded 2003. The Building blocks are a symbol for reuse and remixing of creative works, used also as symbol of the Remix culture.

QuestionCopyright.org is another organization whose stated mission is "to highlight the economic, artistic, and social harm caused by distribution monopolies, and to demonstrate how freedom-based distribution is better for artists and audiences."

QuestionCopyright may be best known for its association with artist Nina Paley, whose multi-award-winning feature length animation Sita Sings The Blues has been held up as a successful example of free distribution under the aegis of the "Sita Distribution Project". The web site of the organization has a number of resources, publications, and other references related to various copyright, patent, and trademark issues.

The student organization Students for Free Culture is sometimes confusingly called "the Free Culture Movement", but that is not its official name. The organization is a subset of the greater movement. The first chapter was founded in 1998 at Swarthmore College, and by 2008, the organization had 26 chapters.

The free-culture movement takes the ideals of the free and open-source software movement and extends them from the field of software to all cultural and creative works. Free Software and Free Culture movements are both about freedom; sharing, modifying, and distributing creative stuff. Both movements push back against restrictive copyright laws, but they have different focuses. The Free Software movement is about ethics in software and making sure users are free to do what they want with their tech. Meanwhile, the Free Culture movement is more about freedom for cultural works, whether that’s art, music, or anything else that helps society share knowledge and creativity.

Early in Creative Commons' life, Richard Stallman (the founder of the Free Software Foundation and the free software movement) supported the organization. He withdrew his support due to the introduction of several licenses including the developing nations (retired in 2007) and sampling licenses. Stallman later restored some support when Creative Commons retired those licenses.

The free music movement, a subset of the free-culture movement, started out just as the Web rose in popularity with the Free Music Philosophy by Ram Samudrala in early 1994. It was also based on the idea of free software by Richard Stallman and coincided with nascent open art and open information movements (referred to here as collectively as the "free-culture movement"). The Free Music Philosophy used a three-pronged approach to voluntarily encourage the spread of unrestricted copying, based on the fact that copies of recordings and compositions could be made and distributed with complete accuracy and ease via the Internet. The subsequent free music movement was reported on by diverse media outlets including Billboard, Forbes, Levi's Original Music Magazine, The Free Radical, Wired and The New York Times. Along with the explosion of the Web driven by open source software and Linux, the rise of P2P and lossy compression, and despite the efforts of the music industry, free music became largely a reality in the early 21st century. Organizations such as the Electronic Frontier Foundation and Creative Commons with free information champions like Lawrence Lessig were devising numerous licenses that offered different flavors of copyright and copyleft. The question was no longer why and how music should be free, but rather how creativity would flourish while musicians developed models to generate revenue in the Internet era.

== Reception ==
=== Skepticism from Richard Stallman ===
Initially, Free Software Foundation founder Richard Stallman did not see the importance of free works beyond software. For instance for manuals and books Stallman stated in the 1990s:

As a general rule, I don't believe that it is essential for people to have permission to modify all sorts of articles and books. The issues for writings are not necessarily the same as those for software. For example, I don't think you or I are obliged to give permission to modify articles like this one, which describe our actions and our views.

Similarly, in 1999 Stallman said that he sees "no social imperative for free hardware designs like the imperative for free software". Other authors, such as Joshua Pearce, have argued that there is an ethical imperative for open-source hardware, specifically with respect to open-source-appropriate technology for sustainable development.

Later, Stallman changed his position slightly and advocated for free sharing of information in 2009. But, in 2011 Stallman commented on the Megaupload founder's arrest, "I think all works meant for practical uses must be free, but that does not apply to music, since music is meant for appreciation, not for practical use." In a follow-up Stallman differentiated three classes: works of practical use should be free, works representing points of view should be shareable but not changeable and works of art or entertainment should be copyrighted (but only for 10 years). In an essay in 2012 Stallman argued that video games as software should be free but not their artwork. In 2015 Stallman advocated for free hardware designs.

=== Copyright proponents ===
Vocal criticism against the free-culture movement comes from copyright proponents.

Prominent technologist and musician Jaron Lanier discusses this perspective of free culture in his 2010 book You Are Not a Gadget. Lanier's concerns include the depersonalization of crowd-sourced anonymous media (such as Wikipedia) and the economic dignity of middle-class creative artists.

Andrew Keen, a critic of Web 2.0, criticizes some of the free culture ideas in his book, Cult of the Amateur, describing Lessig as an "intellectual property communist".

The decline of the news media industry's market share is blamed on free culture but scholars like Clay Shirky claim that the market itself, not free culture, is what is killing the journalism industry.

The free art movement is distinct from the free culture movement as the artist retains full copyright for the work. The free art movement is the practice of artists leaving art in public places for the public to remove and keep. The artwork is usually tagged with a notice stating it is free art, and either with the artist's name or left anonymously. The movement was reinvigorated by British street art practitioner My Dog Sighs coining the term "Free Art Fridays". Clues to the location of artworks are sometimes left on social media to combine treasure hunting with art.

== See also ==
- 2600: The Hacker Quarterly – American underground technology publication
- Access to knowledge movement – Social movement
- Anti-copyright notice – Statement encouraging the unrestricted distribution of a work
- Commodification – Transformation of goods, services, ideas and people into commodities or objects of trade
- Commons-based peer production – Method of producing value
- Copyleft – Preservation of legal rights in the reuse of a work
- Copyright abolition – Movement advocating to abolish copyright
- Criticism of copyright – Dissenting views of copyright law
- Criticism of intellectual property – Ownership of creative expressions and processes
- Culture vs. Copyright – 2014 book by Anatoly G. Volynets
- Cypherpunk – Activist advocating widespread use of strong cryptography
- Free content – Free licensed works in any field
- Free education – Education funded by taxation
- Freedom of information – Freedom of a person or people to publish and consume information
- Free software – Software licensed to be freely used, modified and distributed
- Information wants to be free – Phrase
- Internet freedom – Digital rights, freedom of information and the right to Internet access and speech
- Open content – Free licensed works in any field
- Open-design movement – Movement for publicly shared designs
- Open educational resources – Open learning resource
- Open-source architecture – Architecture documentation paradigm
- Open-source model – Publishing digital resources with their source files
- Open-source movement – Open collaboration movement supporting open-source licenses
- Patentleft – Royalty-free patent licensing
- Pirate Party – Type of political party
- Remix culture – Culture encouraging the creation of derivative works
- Science 2.0 – Scientific Elementary Intermedia
- Sharing economy – Economic and social systems that enable shared access to assets
- The Virtual Revolution
