= List of free-content licenses =

This is a list of free-content licenses not specifically intended for software. For information on software-related licenses, see Comparison of free and open-source software licenses.

A variety of free-content licenses exist, some of them tailored to a specific purpose. Also listed are open-hardware licenses, which may be used on design documents of and custom-made software for open-source hardware.

== List ==
=== For documents and text ===
- FreeBSD Documentation License
- GNU Free Documentation License, or GFDL
- GNU Simpler Free Documentation License, or GSFDL
- Open Content License, obsolete
- Open Publication License, obsolete

=== For any type of content ===
- Against DRM license
- Creative Commons licenses which are considered free:
  - Creative Commons Attribution, or CC BY
  - Creative Commons Attribution-ShareAlike, or CC BY-SA
  - Creative Commons Zero, or CC0
- Creative Archive Licence, discontinued license of the BBC Archive
- Design Science License
- Free Art License
- Korean Open Access License
- MirOS Licence
- WTFPL

=== For fonts ===
- Apache License
- SIL Open Font License
- Ubuntu Font License
- See also: GPL font exception

=== For hardware ===
- CERN Open Hardware License
- Simputer General Public License
- TAPR Open Hardware License

=== For tabletop games ===
- Dominion Rules Licence
- Open Game License

=== Other content ===
- Open Audio License, for audio
- Open Database License, or ODbL, for databases

== Using software licenses for other content ==
The FSF, as a party with a mission to proliferate the GPL, has claimed some free software licenses, including the GNU General Public License (GPL) can also be used to license content other than software. However, the FSF has recommended against using the GPL for educational works.
