= Definition of Free Cultural Works =

Project to define free content

Definition of Free Cultural Works logo, selected in a logo contest in 2006

The Definition of Free Cultural Works is a project that evaluates and recommends compatible free content licenses. Launched in 2006 by Creative Commons' Erik Möller in collaboration with Richard Stallman, Lawrence Lessig, Benjamin Mako Hill, and others, it was created to establish a clear standard for defining free content. The project is used as a reference by the Wikimedia Foundation in its licensing policy. In 2008, the Creative Commons Attribution and Attribution-ShareAlike licenses were formally designated as "Approved for Free Cultural Works." The Definition of Free Cultural Works has since become closely aligned with other open content frameworks, including the Open Knowledge Foundation's Open Definition, the Open Source Definition, and the Free Software Definition.

== History ==
The Open Content Project by David A. Wiley in 1998 was a predecessor project which defined open content. In 2003, Wiley joined the Creative Commons as "Director of Educational Licenses" and announced the Creative Commons and their licenses as successors to his Open Content Project.

Therefore, Creative Commons' Erik Möller in collaboration with Richard Stallman, Lawrence Lessig, Benjamin Mako Hill, Angela Beesley, and others started in 2006 the Free Cultural Works project for defining free content. The first draft of the Definition of Free Cultural Works was published 2 April 2006. The 1.0 and 1.1 versions were published in English and translated into several languages.

The Definition of Free Cultural Works is used by the Wikimedia Foundation. In 2008, the Attribution and Attribution-ShareAlike Creative Commons licenses were marked as "Approved for Free Cultural Works".

Following in June 2009, Wikipedia migrated to use two licenses: the Creative Commons Attribution-ShareAlike as main license, additionally to the previously used GNU Free Documentation License (which was made compatible). An improved license compatibility with the greater free content ecosystem was given as reason for the license change.

In October 2014, the Open Knowledge Foundation's Open Definition 2.0 for Open Works and Open Licenses described "open" as synonymous to the definition of free in the "Definition of Free Cultural Works" (and also the Open Source Definition and Free Software Definition). A distinct difference is the focus given to the public domain and that it focuses also on the accessibility ("open access") and the readability ("open formats"). The same three creative commons licenses are recommended for open content (CC BY, CC BY-SA, and CC0) as additionally three for open data intended own licenses, the Open Data Commons Public Domain Dedication and Licence (PDDL), the Open Data Commons Attribution License (ODC-BY) and the Open Data Commons Open Database License (ODbL).

== "Free cultural works" approved licenses ==
- Against DRM
- BSD-like non-copyleft licenses
- CERN Open Hardware License
- CC0
- Creative Commons Attribution (CC BY)
- Creative Commons Attribution ShareAlike (CC BY-SA)
- Design Science License
- Free Art License
- FreeBSD Documentation License
- GNU Free Documentation License (without invariant sections)
- GNU General Public License
- MirOS Licence
- MIT License
- Open Publication License

== See also ==
- Free culture movement
- Open Definition
- Open Source Definition
- Free Software Definition
- Creative Commons licenses
- License compatibility
