= Public copyright license =

Type of license

A public license or public copyright license is a license by which a copyright holder as licensor can grant additional copyright permissions to any and all persons in the general public as licensees. By applying a public license to a work, provided that the licensees obey the terms and conditions of the license, copyright holders give permission for others to copy or change their work in ways that would otherwise infringe copyright law.

Some public licenses, such as the GNU GPL and the CC BY-SA, are also considered free or open copyright licenses. However, other public licenses like the CC BY-NC are not open licenses, because they contain restrictions on commercial or other types of use.

Public copyright licenses do not limit their licensees. In other words, any person can take advantage of the license. The former Creative Commons (CC) Developing Nations License was not a public copyright license, because it limited licensees to those in developing nations. Current Creative Commons licenses are explicitly identified as public licenses. Any person can apply a CC license to their work, and any person can take advantage of the license to use the licensed work according to the terms and conditions of the relevant license.

According to the Open Knowledge Foundation, a public copyright license does not limit licensors either. Under this definition, license contract texts specific to a single licensor (like the UK government’s Open Government License, which would have to be edited to be used by other licensors) are not considered public copyright licenses, although they may qualify as open licenses.

Some organisations approve public copyright licenses that meet certain criteria, in particular being free or open licenses. The Free Software Foundation keeps a list of FSF-approved software licenses and free documentation licenses. The Open Source Initiative keeps a similar list of OSI-approved software licenses. The Open Knowledge Foundation has a list of OKFN-approved licenses for content and data licensing.

== Types of copyright license ==
The implied license imposed by the Berne Convention, and the public domain (the CC0 license as waiver), are the references for any other public license. Considering all cultural works, as in the Open Definition, the four freedoms summarizes the main differences:

User (licensee) right	Berne	CC0
0. free access, and freedom to use the work as you wish ("use" includes to run a program or to execute a music score)	Partial (some restrictions to execute)	Yes
1. freedom to access the "source-code" and use it as you wish, for study or change it for personal use.	No	Yes
2. freedom to redistribute copies	No	Yes
2.1 right to quote (freedom to redistribute copies of fragments)	Yes, small size.	Yes, any size.
3. freedom to distribute copies of your modified versions to others	No	Yes

The "open licenses" preserve the main freedoms of CC0, but add some reasonable restriction. Labeling by its acronyms, the main restrictions are:

- BY (attribution): restriction on freedoms 2, 3 or 2.1, the copy must to cite (attribute); give the author or licensor the credits in the manner specified by these.
- SA (share-alike): restriction on freedoms 2 or 3, the copy must be distributed under a license identical to the license that governs the original work (see copyleft).
- ND (Non-derivative): exclusion of freedom 3.
- NC (Non-commercial): partial exclusion of freedoms 2 and 3 of commercial purposes.
- Other: other less usual restrictions on "open licenses".

== Varieties ==
Free licenses are a popular subset of public copyright licenses. They include free and open source software licenses and free content licenses. To qualify as a libre license, a public copyright license must allow licensees to share and adapt the licensed work for any purpose, including commercial ones. Licenses that purport to release a work into the public domain are a type of libre license.

Share-alike licenses require derivatives of the licensed work to be released under the same license as the original. When a libre license has a share-alike term, it is called a copyleft license. Libre licenses without share-alike terms are sometimes called permissive licenses.

The Creative Commons public copyright license suite includes licenses with attribution, share-alike, non-commercial and no-derivatives conditions. It also offers a public domain license and the Founders' Copyright license.

Open supplement licenses permit derivatives of the work (specifically material that supplements the original work) but not duplicates.

=== Public domain like licenses ===
A subset of public copyright licenses which aim for no restrictions at all like public domain ("full permissive"), are public domain-like licenses. The 2000 released WTFPL license is a short public domain like software license. The 2009 released CC0 was created as public domain license for all content with compatibility with also law domains (e.g. Civil law of continental Europe) where dedicating into public domain is problematic. This is achieved by a public domain waiver statement and a fall-back all-permissive license. The Unlicense, published around 2010, has a focus on an anti-copyright message. The Unlicense offers a public domain waiver text with a fall-back public domain-like license inspired by permissive licenses but without attribution.

== See also ==
- Anti-copyright notice
- Copyright
- Copyright reform movement
- Free and open-source software
- Open content/Free content
- Public-domain-equivalent license
