= Miros =

Miros may refer to:

- Anna Miros (born 1985), Polish volleyball player
- MirOS BSD, operating system
- MirOS Licence, content licence
- Malaysian Institute of Road Safety Research, Malaysian government statutory body
