= Free information =

Free information may refer to:

- the tenet that "Information wants to be free"
- Free content, creative work for which there are very minimal copyright limitations
- "II. Zealots of Stockholm (Free Information)", a song by Childish Gambino on Because the Internet

== See also ==
- Freedom of information, freedom of people to publish and have access to information
- Free and open-source software
  - Free software
  - GNU Project, a free software, mass collaboration project
