= Openness =

Philosophical concept emphasising transparency and collaboration

Openness is an overarching concept that is characterized by an emphasis on receptivity, access and collaboration. That is, openness refers to "open to one-another, accessibility of knowledge, technology and other resources; the transparency of action; the permeability of organisational structures; and the inclusiveness of participation". Openness can be said to be the opposite of closedness, central authority and secrecy.

== Openness in life ==
Openness is a law of the universe and a central part of life and evolution. Exceptions to this rule in nature do not exist.

== Openness in human systems ==
Openness is the basis of the free world - and the foundation and engine of democracy, the free market economy and the internet. Openness enables free speech, free choice, free trade and free share of knowledge. More openness leads to more independence and progress. Reduction of openness leads, via hierarchy or misuse of power, to restrictions, suppression, corruption, monopoly and autocracy.

Openness has been attributed to a wide array of approaches in very different contexts as outlined below.

== In government ==
Open government is the governing doctrine which holds that citizens have the right to access the documents and proceedings of the government to allow for effective public oversight.

Openness in government applies the idea of freedom of information to information held by authorities and holds that citizens should have the right to see the operations and activities of government at work. Since reliable information is requisite for accountability, freedom of access to information about the government supports government accountability and helps protect other necessary rights.

== In creative works ==
Open content and free content both refer to creative works that lack restrictions on how people can use, modify, and distribute them. The terms derive from open source software and free software, similar concepts that refer specifically to software.

== In education ==
Open education refers to institutional practices and programmatic initiatives that broaden access to the learning and training traditionally offered through formal education systems. By eliminating barriers to entry, open education aids freedom of information by increasing accessibility.

Open Education advocates state people from all social classes worldwide have open access to high-quality education and resources. They help eliminate obstacles like high costs, outmoded materials, and legal instruments. These barriers impede collaboration among stakeholders. Cooperation is crucial to open education. The Open Education Consortium claims “Sharing is a fundamental attribute of education. Education means the sharing of knowledge, insights, and information with everybody. It is the foundation of new wisdom, ideas, talents, and understanding”. Open Educational Resources refer to learning materials that educators can improve and modify with permission from their publishers or authors. Creators of OERs are allowed to include a variety of items such as lesson plans, presentation slides, lecture videos, podcasts, worksheets, maps, and images.

There are legitimate tools like the Creative Commons’ licenses that students can access and use at liberty. They are allowed to translate and amend these materials. Public school teachers in the USA can share resources they developed as compliance for government-authorized standards in education. One of these is called the Common Core State Standards. Some teachers and school officials have recommended that OERs can help reduce expenses in production and distribution of course materials for primary and secondary institutions. Some teachers and school officials have recommended that OERs can help reduce expenses in production and distribution of course materials for primary and secondary institutions. Certain projects like the OER Commons as storage for open educational resources.

A related concept predominantly used in the education sphere is open recognition, which refers to open ways of sharing learning and skill recognition, including from informal learning experiences. Under open recognition, people's learning can be recognized beyond, but inclusive of, credentials that are traditionally recognized such as degrees.

== In science ==
Open science refers to the practice of allowing peer-reviewed research articles to be available online free of charge and free of most copyright and licensing restrictions. Benefits of this approach include: accelerated discovery and progress as researchers are free to use and build on the findings of others, giving back to the public as much research is paid for with public funds, and greater impact for one's work due to open access articles being accessible to a bigger audience.

== In information technology ==
There are many aspects of openness in information technology, such as:

- Open Source
- Open Weights
- Open Standards
- Open Hardware
- Open Platforms

In Open-source software, the user is given access to the sources such as source code, whereas Open-weight artificial intelligence refers to the artefact itself (typically a model, e.g. a Large Language Model) being made available, with some degree of access to training data, code and parameters that led to the creation of the model itself. In Open-source hardware, the user gets access to sources such as design documents and blueprints. Open data is data that can be freely used and shared by anyone.

== In psychology ==
In psychology, openness to experience is one of the domains which are used to describe human personality in the Five Factor Model.

== In business ==
Open business is an approach to enterprise that draws on ideas from openness movements like free software, open source, open content and open tools and standards. The approach places value on transparency, stakeholder inclusion, and accountability.

Open business structures make contributors and non-contributors visible so that business benefits are distributed accordingly. They seek to increase personal engagement and positive outcomes by rewarding contributors in an open way.

== See also ==
- Accessibility
- Free association
- Free content
- Free software
- Glasnost
- Open access: publishing
- Open data
- Open innovation
- Open education
- Open educational resources
- Open-design movement
- Open government
- Open Knowledge Foundation
- Open knowledge
- Open-mindedness
- Open text
- Open gaming
- Open patent
- Open-source curriculum
- Open-source governance
- Open-source journalism
- Open-source model
- Open standard
- Openness to experience
- Secrecy: the opposite of openness
- The Open Definition
- Transparency: openness in a utilitarian view, economic openness, open economic or politic data, degree of openness, etc.

== References and notes ==
- Eco, Umberto; Anna Cancogni; David Robey (1989). The Open Work. Harvard University Press. ISBN 9780674639751.
- Schlagwein, Daniel; Conboy, Kieran; Feller, Joseph; Leimeister, Jan Marco; Morgan, Lorraine (2017). "Openness With and Without Information Technology: A Framework and a Brief History". Journal of Information Technology. 32 (4): 297–305. doi:10.1057/s41265-017-0049-3. hdl:10379/13819.
