= Koal =

Koal or KOAL may refer to:

== People with the surname ==
- Daniela Koal, a figure skater at the 1995 German Figure Skating Championships
- Jacob Koal (born 2004), Kenyan soccer player for South Sudan at the 2023 U-20 Africa Cup of Nations squads
- Kilian Koal, German soccer player for SC Gatow

== Fictional characters ==
- Chief Koal, in Auntie Lee's Meat Pies
- Koal, in Dhoom Machaao Dhoom
- Koal, in the 2005 video game Advance Wars: Dual Strike

== Other uses ==
- KOAL, a radio station in Price, Utah, U.S.
- Korean Open Access License, a copyleft license
- Koal, the stick of a chenda percussion instrument

== See also ==
- Coal (disambiguation)
- Koala (disambiguation)
- Kaul (disambiguation)
