= MirOS Licence =

Free content license used by the MirOS project

The MirOS Licence
- Author: The MirOS Project
- Latest version: CVS r1.19 – can be considered the first version
- Published: 11 December 2006
- SPDX identifier: MirOS
- Debian FSG compatible: Yes
- FSF approved: Yes
- OSI approved: Yes
- GPL compatible: Yes
- Copyleft: No
- Linking from code with a different license: Yes
- Website: HTML version, UTF-8 plain text version

The MirOS Licence, also known as the MirBSD License, is a free content license (for software and other free cultural works such as audiovisual, fictional, graphical, literal, musical, textual, etc.) originated at The MirOS Project for their own publications because the ISC license used by OpenBSD was perceived as having problems with wording and too America centric. It has strong roots in the UCB BSD licence and the Historical Permission Notice and Disclaimer with a focus on modern, explicit, legible language and usability by European (except UK), specifically German, authors (while not hindering adoption by authors from other legislations). It is a permissive ("BSD/MIT-style") licence.

Another novelty is that this licence was specified for any kind of copyrightable work from the start; as such, it not only meets the Open Source Definition and Debian Free Software Guidelines but also the Open Knowledge Definition and, in fact, has been approved by the OKFN long before OSI did.

The licence has not seen formal legal review, but is listed on ifrOSS' licence centre webpages. The Free Software Foundation has not formally added the licence as either a free software licence or Free Documentation License to their pages, but their software directory has a category for it.

The license was accepted as a free content license according to the Free Cultural Works definition.
