= TFSD =

TFSD may refer to:

- Twin Falls School District, the School District for Twin Falls, Idaho
- The Free Software Definition
