= Rufus Pollock =

British economist, activist and social entrepreneur

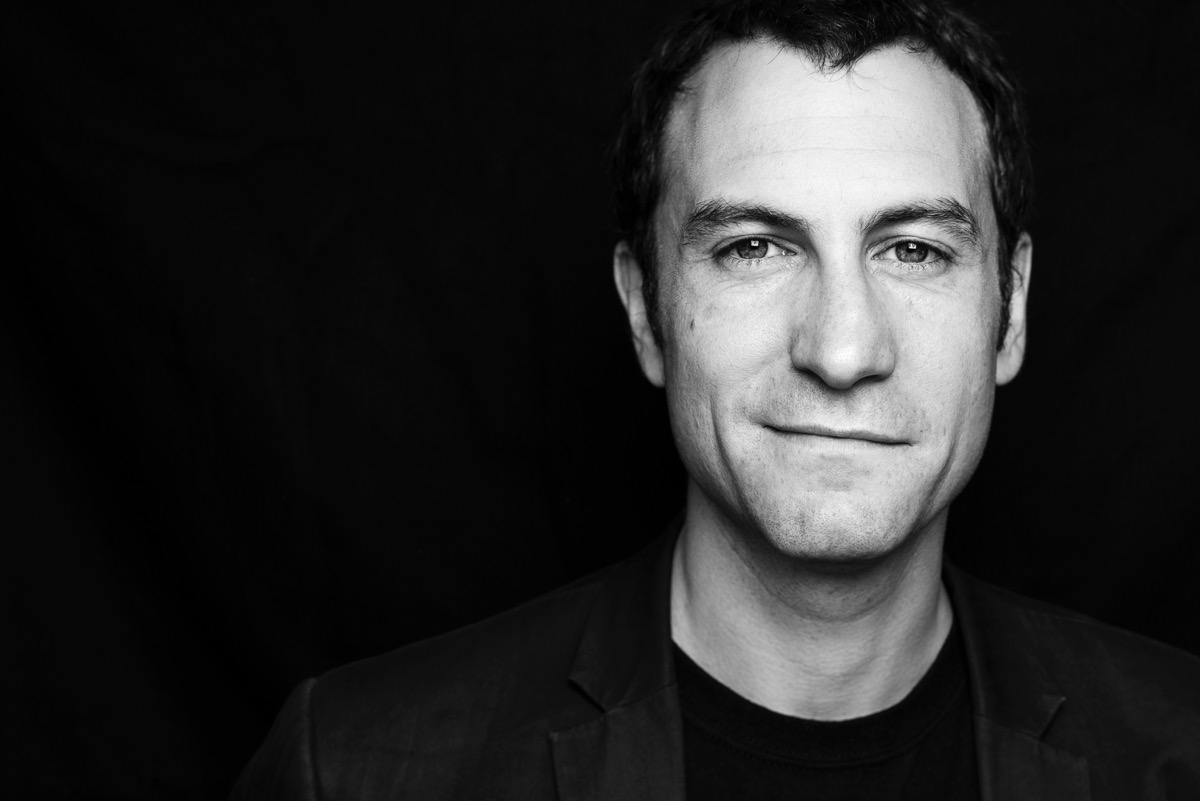
- Pollock in 2017
- Born: 1980 (age 45–46)
- Education: Oundle School; University of Cambridge
- Scientific career
- Thesis: Should We Give Every Cow Its Calf? Monopoly, Competition and Transaction Costs in the Promotion of Innovation and Creativity (2008)
- Doctoral advisor: Rupert Gatti; David Newbery
- Website: rufuspollock.com

Rufus Pollock (born 1980) is a British economist, activist and social entrepreneur.

He has been a leading figure in the global open knowledge and open data movements, starting with his founding in 2004 of the non-profit Open Knowledge Foundation which he led until 2015. From 2007–2010 he was the Mead Fellow in Economics at Emmanuel College, Cambridge, and from 2010–2013 he was a Shuttleworth Foundation fellow. In 2012 he was appointed an Ashoka Fellow and remains an Associate of the Centre for Intellectual Property and Information Law at the University of Cambridge and continues to serve on the board of Open Knowledge International. Since leaving Open Knowledge International, his work has moved to focus more on broader issues of social transformation and in 2016 he co-founded a new non-profit "Life Itself". However, he has continued to work actively on the economics and politics of the information age, including publishing "The Open Revolution: Rewriting the Rules of the Information Age" in 2018.

Whilst at Open Knowledge International he initiated a variety of projects, many of which continue to be active. In 2005 he created The Open Definition which provided the first formal definition of open content and open data, and which has remained the standard reference definition. In 2005–06 he created the first version of CKAN, open source software for finding and sharing datasets, especially open datasets. CKAN has evolved and is the leading open data platform software in the world, used by governments including the US and UK, to publish millions of public datasets.

He helped to lead or co-found other organizations including Open Rights Group (2005, co-founder and board member), Foundation for a Free Information Infrastructure (2005-6, UK director), Creative Commons UK, Datopian (founder) and Life Itself (co-founder).

== Work ==
Pollock's 2018 book

On 24 May 2004 Pollock founded in Cambridge, UK the Open Knowledge Foundation as a global non-profit network that promotes and shares open knowledge including open data and open content - information that is openly and freely available.

In 2007 and 2009, Pollock published two important papers regarding the optimal copyright term, where he proposed based on an economical model with empirically-estimable parameters an optimal duration of 15 years, significantly shorter than any currently existing copyright term.

He has held the Mead Research Fellowship in economics at Emmanuel College, Cambridge.

In 2009, he was credited by web inventor Tim Berners-Lee for starting the Raw Data Now meme.

In 2010 he was appointed as one of the four founding members of the UK Government's Public Sector Transparency Board.

In 2018 he published his first book The Open Revolution: Rewriting the Rules of the Information Age, making it openly available for download online.

== Bibliography ==
- The Open Revolution: Rewriting the Rules of the Information Age (2018)
