= International Open Data Day =

- Status: Active
- Begins: March 6, 2021
- Frequency: Annually
- Inaugurated: December 4, 2010

International Open Data Day is an annual event that promotes awareness and use of open data.

The event takes place globally, usually in February or March. Typical activities include talks, seminars, demonstrations, hackathons, training or the announcement of open data releases or other milestones in open data. In some countries it occurs along with Code Across coding events.

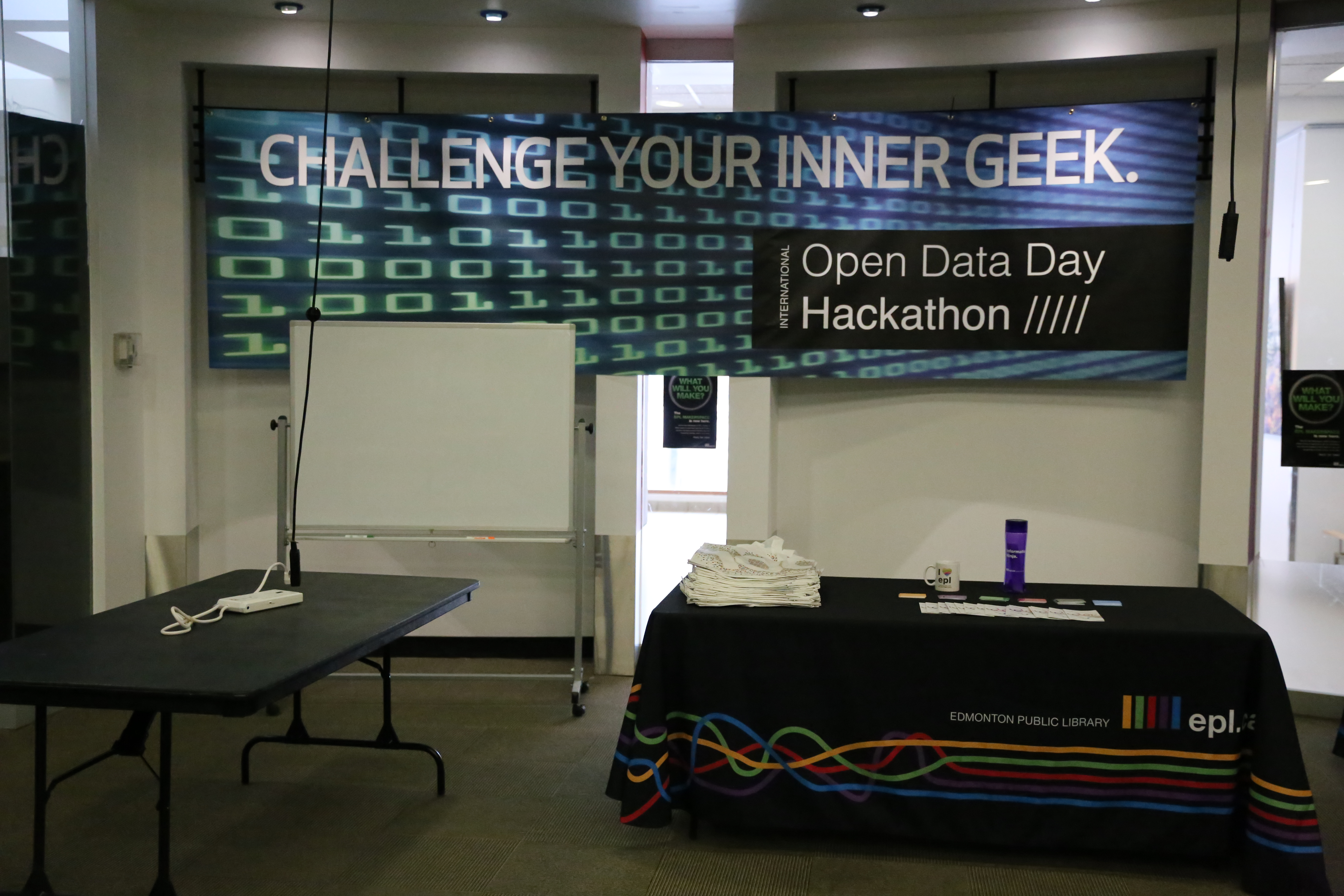
At the EPL Makerspace in Edmonton.

== History ==
International Open Data Day was first proposed by David Eaves in 2010. The idea followed discussions with Edward Ocampo-Gooding, Mary Beth Baker, Daniel Beauchamp, Pedro Markun, and Daniela Silva.

Today, the event coordination is done through its google mailing list. The date for the event is chosen by the group members taking into consideration different cultural events.

From 2015, Open Knowledge Foundation - in cooperation with other NGOs from the open data world - has offered mini-grants to support the facilitation of events around the globe.

=== Dates ===
- December 4, 2010
- December 3, 2011
- February 23, 2013
- February 22, 2014
- February 21, 2015
- March 5, 2016
- March 4, 2017
- March 3, 2018
- March 2, 2019
- March 7, 2020
- March 6, 2021
- March 5, 2022
- March 4 - March 10, 2023
- March 2 - March 8, 2024
- March 1 - March 7, 2025

== Notable Announcements ==
In 2016, Megan Smith, United States CTO, endorsed Open Data Day with a special video. “ We need you the most. If it weren’t for you, this whole thing wouldn’t be happening. We need ideas, cheerleaders, and friends to spread the word.”

“This day is a chance for people around the world to support and encourage the adoption of open data policies by local, regional and central governments,” said New Zealand Land Information Minister Louise Upston in 2016.

== See also ==
- Open Access Week
