= Free content =

Free licensed works in any field

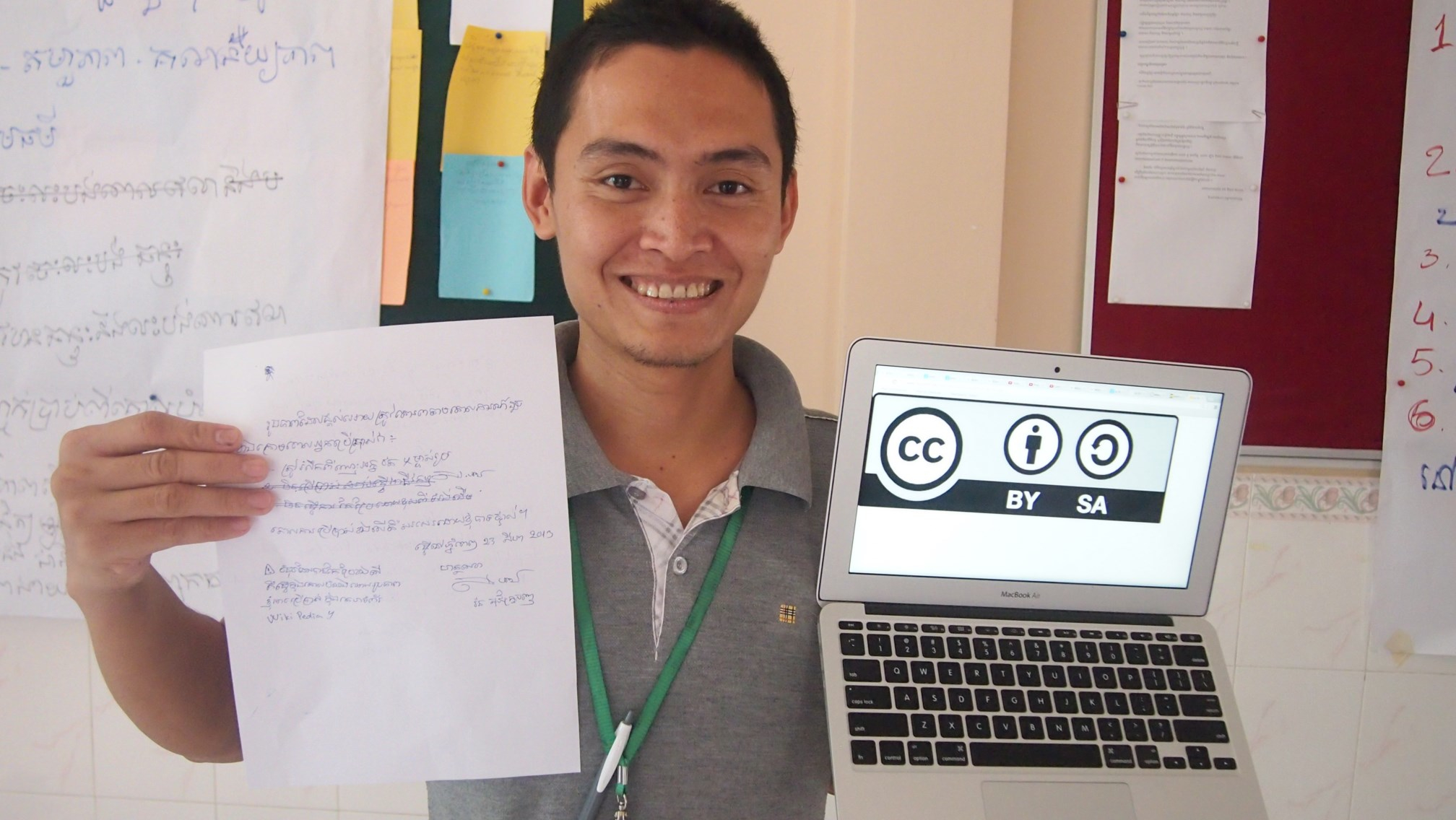
The logo on the computer screen represents a Creative Commons license, while the paper explains (in Khmer) that the image is free content.

Free content, libre content, or open content (also called free information, libre information, open information) is any kind of creative work, such as a work of art, a book, a software program, or any other creative content with minimal copyright and other legal limitations on usage, modification and distribution. These are works or expressions which can be freely studied, applied, copied and modified by anyone for any purpose. Often this includes commercial purposes, as explicitly required by some definitions of free content. Free content encompasses all works in the public domain, as well as works copyrighted under licenses that comply with the Definition of Free Cultural Works.

In most countries, the Berne Convention grants copyright holders control over their creations by default. Therefore, copyrighted content must be explicitly declared free by the authors, which is usually accomplished by referencing or including licensing statements from within the work. The right to reuse such a work is granted by the authors in a license known as a free license, a free distribution license, or an open license, depending on the rights assigned. These freedoms given to users in the reuse of works (that is, the right to freely use, study, modify or distribute these works, possibly also for commercial purposes) are often associated with obligations (to cite the original author, to maintain the original license of the reused content) or restrictions (excluding commercial use, banning certain media) chosen by the author. There are a number of standardized licenses offering varied options that allow authors to choose the type of reuse of their work that they wish to authorize or forbid.

== Definition ==
There are a number of different definitions of free content in regular use. Legally, however, free content is very similar to open content. An analogy is a use of the rival terms free software and open-source software, which describe ideological differences rather than legal ones. The term Open Source, by contrast, sought to encompass them all in one movement. For instance, the Open Knowledge Foundation's Open Definition describes "open" as synonymous with the definition of free in the "Definition of Free Cultural Works" (as also in the Open Source Definition and Free Software Definition). For such free/open content both movements recommend the same three Creative Commons licenses, the CC BY, CC BY-SA, and CC0.

== Legal background ==
=== Copyright ===
Copyright symbol

Copyright is a legal concept, which gives the author or creator of a work legal control over the duplication and public performance of their work. In many jurisdictions, this is limited by a time period after which the works then enter the public domain. Copyright laws are a balance between the rights of creators of intellectual and artistic works and the rights of others to build upon those works. During the time period of copyright the author's work may only be copied, modified, or publicly performed with the consent of the author, unless the use is a fair use. Traditional copyright control limits the use of the work of the author to those who either pay royalties to the author for usage of the author's content or limit their use to fair use. Secondly, it limits the use of content whose author cannot be found. Finally, it creates a perceived barrier between authors by limiting derivative works, such as mashups and collaborative content. Although open content has been described as a counterbalance to copyright, open content licenses rely on a copyright holder's power to license their work, as copyleft which also utilizes copyright for such a purpose.

=== Public domain ===
Public domain symbol

The public domain is a range of creative works whose copyright has expired or was never established, as well as ideas and facts (Note: The copyright status of uncreative aggregates of basic data may differ by region—for the US see Feist Publications v. Rural Telephone Service; for Australia, see Telstra v Desktop Marketing Systems.) which are ineligible for copyright. A public domain work is a work whose author has either relinquished to the public or no longer can claim control over, the distribution and usage of the work. As such, any person may manipulate, distribute, or otherwise use the work, without legal ramifications. A work in the public domain or released under a permissive license may be referred to as "copycenter".

=== Copyleft ===
Copyleft symbol

Copyleft is a play on the word copyright and describes the practice of using copyright law to remove restrictions on distributing copies and modified versions of a work. The aim of copyleft is to use the legal framework of copyright to enable non-author parties to be able to reuse and, in many licensing schemes, modify content that is created by an author. Unlike works in the public domain, the author still maintains copyright over the material, however, the author has granted a non-exclusive license to any person to distribute, and often modify, the work. Copyleft licenses require that any derivative works be distributed under the same terms and that the original copyright notices be maintained. A symbol commonly associated with copyleft is a reversal of the copyright symbol, facing the other way; the opening of the C points left rather than right. Unlike the copyright symbol, the copyleft symbol does not have a codified meaning.

== Usage ==
Projects that provide free content exist in several areas of interest, such as software, academic literature, general literature, music, images, video, and engineering. Technology has reduced the cost of publication and reduced the entry barrier sufficiently to allow for the production of widely disseminated materials by individuals or small groups. Projects to provide free literature and multimedia content have become increasingly prominent owing to the ease of dissemination of materials that are associated with the development of computer technology. Such dissemination may have been too costly prior to these technological developments.

=== Media ===
Creative Commons logo

In media, which includes textual, audio, and visual content, free licensing schemes such as some of the licenses made by Creative Commons have allowed for the dissemination of works under a clear set of legal permissions. Not all Creative Commons licenses are entirely free; their permissions may range from very liberal general redistribution and modification of the work to a more restrictive redistribution-only licensing. Since February 2008, Creative Commons licenses which are entirely free carry a badge indicating that they are "approved for free cultural works". Repositories exist which exclusively feature free material and provide content such as photographs, clip art, music, literature and news articles. While extensive reuse of free content from one website in another website is legal, it is usually not sensible because of the duplicate content problem. Wikipedia is amongst the most well-known databases of user-uploaded free content on the web. While the vast majority of content on Wikipedia is free content, some copyrighted material is hosted under fair use criteria.

=== Software ===
OSI logo

Free and open-source software, which is often referred to as open source software and free software, is a maturing technology with companies using them to provide services and technology to both end-users and technical consumers. The ease of dissemination increases modularity, which allows for smaller groups to contribute to projects as well as simplifying collaboration. Some claim that open source development models offer similar peer-recognition and collaborative benefit incentive as in more classical fields such as scientific research, with the social structures that result leading to decreased production costs.

Free Software Foundation logo

Given sufficient interest in a software component, by using peer-to-peer distribution methods, distribution costs may be reduced, easing the burden of infrastructure maintenance on developers. As distribution is simultaneously provided by consumers, these software distribution models are scalable; that is, the method is feasible regardless of the number of consumers. In some cases, free software vendors may use peer-to-peer technology as a method of dissemination. Project hosting and code distribution is not a problem for most free projects as a number of providers offer these services free of charge.

=== Engineering and technology ===
Logo of the Open Source Hardware Association

Free content principles have been translated into fields such as engineering, where designs and engineering knowledge can be readily shared and duplicated, in order to reduce overheads associated with project development. Open design principles can be applied in engineering and technological applications, with projects in mobile telephony, small-scale manufacture, the automotive industry, and even agricultural areas. Technologies such as distributed manufacturing can allow computer-aided manufacturing and computer-aided design techniques to be able to develop small-scale production of components for the development of new, or repair of existing, devices. Rapid fabrication technologies underpin these developments, which allow end-users of technology to be able to construct devices from pre-existing blueprints, using software and manufacturing hardware to convert information into physical objects.

=== Academia ===
In academic work, the majority of works are not free, although the percentage of works that are open access is growing. Open access refers to online research outputs that are free of all restrictions to access and free of many restrictions on use (e.g. certain copyright and license restrictions). Authors may see open access publishing as a way of expanding the audience that is able to access their work to allow for greater impact, or support it for ideological reasons. Open access publishers such as PLOS and BioMed Central provide capacity for review and publishing of free works; such publications are currently more common in science than humanities. Various funding institutions and governing research bodies have mandated that academics must produce their works to be open-access, in order to qualify for funding, such as the US National Institutes of Health, Research Councils UK (effective 2016) and the European Union (effective 2020).

Open access symbol, originally designed by PLOS

At an institutional level, some universities, such as the Massachusetts Institute of Technology, have adopted open access publishing by default by introducing their own mandates. Some mandates may permit delayed publication and may charge researchers for open access publishing. For teaching purposes, some universities, including MIT, provide freely available course content, such as lecture notes, video resources and tutorials. This content is distributed via Internet to the general public. Publication of such resources may be either by a formal institution-wide program, or informally, by individual academics or departments.

Open content publication has been seen as a method of reducing costs associated with information retrieval in research, as universities typically pay to subscribe for access to content that is published through traditional means. Subscriptions for non-free content journals may be expensive for universities to purchase, though the articles are written and peer-reviewed by academics themselves at no cost to the publisher. This has led to disputes between publishers and some universities over subscription costs, such as the one that occurred between the University of California and the Nature Publishing Group.

=== Education ===
UNESCO's Open Educational Resources logo

Free and open content has been used to develop alternative routes towards higher education. Open content is a free way of obtaining higher education that is "focused on collective knowledge and the sharing and reuse of learning and scholarly content." There are multiple projects and organizations that promote learning through open content, including OpenCourseWare and Khan Academy. Some universities, like MIT, Yale, and Tufts are making their courses freely available on the internet.

There are also a number of organizations promoting the creation of openly licensed textbooks such as the University of Minnesota's Open Textbook Library, Connexions, OpenStax College, the Saylor Academy, Open Textbook Challenge, and Wikibooks.

=== Legislation ===
Any country has its own law and legal system, sustained by its legislation, which consists of documents. In a democratic country, laws are published as open content, in principle free content; but in general, there are no explicit licenses attributed for the text of each law, so the license must be assumed as an implied license. Only a few countries have explicit licenses in their law-documents, as the UK's Open Government Licence (a CC BY compatible license). In the other countries, the implied license comes from its proper rules (general laws and rules about copyright in government works). The automatic protection provided by the Berne Convention does not apply to the texts of laws: Article 2.4 excludes the official texts from the automatic protection. It is also possible to "inherit" the license from context. The set of country's law-documents is made available through national repositories. Examples of law-document open repositories: LexML Brazil, Legislation.gov.uk, and N-Lex. In general, a law-document is offered in more than one (open) official version, but the main one is that published by a government gazette. So, law-documents can eventually inherit license expressed by the repository or by the gazette that contains it.

== History ==
=== Origins and Open Content Project ===
The concept of applying free software licenses to content was introduced by Michael Stutz, who in 1997 wrote the paper "Applying Copyleft to Non-Software Information" for the GNU Project. The term "open content" was coined by David A. Wiley in 1998 and evangelized via the Open Content Project, describing works licensed under the Open Content License (a non-free share-alike license, see 'Free content' below) and other works licensed under similar terms.

The website of the Open Content Project once defined open content as 'freely available for modification, use and redistribution under a license similar to those used by the open-source / free software community'. However, such a definition would exclude the Open Content License because that license forbids charging for content; a right required by free and open-source software licenses.

=== 5Rs definition ===
Open Content Project logo, 1998

It has since come to describe a broader class of content without conventional copyright restrictions. The openness of content can be assessed under the '5Rs Framework' based on the extent to which it can be retained, reused, revised, remixed and redistributed by members of the public without violating copyright law. Unlike free content and content under open-source licenses, there is no clear threshold that a work must reach to qualify as 'open content'.

The 5Rs are put forward on the Open Content Project website as a framework for assessing the extent to which content is open:

1. Retain – the right to make, own, and control copies of the content (e.g., download, duplicate, store, and manage)
2. Reuse – the right to use the content in a wide range of ways (e.g., in a class, in a study group, on a website, in a video)
3. Revise – the right to adapt, adjust, modify, or alter the content itself (e.g., translate the content into another language)
4. Remix – the right to combine the original or revised content with other open content to create something new (e.g., incorporate the content into a mashup)
5. Redistribute – the right to share copies of the original content, your revisions, or your remixes with others (e.g., give a copy of the content to a friend)

This broader definition distinguishes open content from open-source software, since the latter must be available for commercial use by the public. However, it is similar to several definitions for open educational resources, which include resources under noncommercial and verbatim licenses.

=== Creative Commons and other successor projects ===
In 2003, David Wiley announced that the Open Content Project had been succeeded by Creative Commons and their licenses; Wiley joined as "Director of Educational Licenses".

In 2005, the Open Icecat project was launched, in which product information for e-commerce applications was created and published under the Open Content License. It was embraced by the tech sector, which was already quite open source minded.

In 2006, a Creative Commons' successor project, the Definition of Free Cultural Works, was introduced for free content. It was put forth by Erik Möller, Richard Stallman, Lawrence Lessig, Benjamin Mako Hill, Angela Beesley, and others. The Definition of Free Cultural Works is used by the Wikimedia Foundation. In 2009, the Attribution and Attribution-ShareAlike Creative Commons licenses were marked as "Approved for Free Cultural Works".

In 2024, Creative Commons became part of the Digital Public Goods Alliance. alongside the Government of Singapore and the United Nations Development Programme. A year later, it became an NGO partner to UNESCO.

==== Open Knowledge Foundation ====
Open Knowledge Foundation logo

Another successor project is the Open Knowledge Foundation, founded by Rufus Pollock in Cambridge, in 2004 as a global non-profit network to promote and share open content and data.

In 2007 the OKF gave an Open Knowledge Definition for "content such as music, films, books; data be it scientific, historical, geographic or otherwise; government and other administrative information". In October 2014 with version 2.0 Open Works and Open Licenses were defined and "open" is described as synonymous to the definitions of open/free in the Open Source Definition, the Free Software Definition, and the Definition of Free Cultural Works.

A distinct difference is the focus given to the public domain, open access, and readable open formats. OKF recommends six conformant licenses: three of OKN's (Open Data Commons Public Domain Dedication and Licence, Open Data Commons Attribution License, Open Data Commons Open Database License) and the CC BY, CC BY-SA, and CC0 Creative Commons licenses.

== See also ==
- Comparison of free and open-source software licenses
- Copyfraud
- Creative Commons license and List of free-content licenses
- Digital rights
- Free education
- Free software movement
- Freedom of information
- Information wants to be free
- Open data
- Open publishing
- Open source
- Open-source hardware
- Project Gutenberg [Knowledge for free – The Emergence of Open Educational Resources]. 2007, ISBN 92-64-03174-X.
