= CKAN =

Web-based data management system

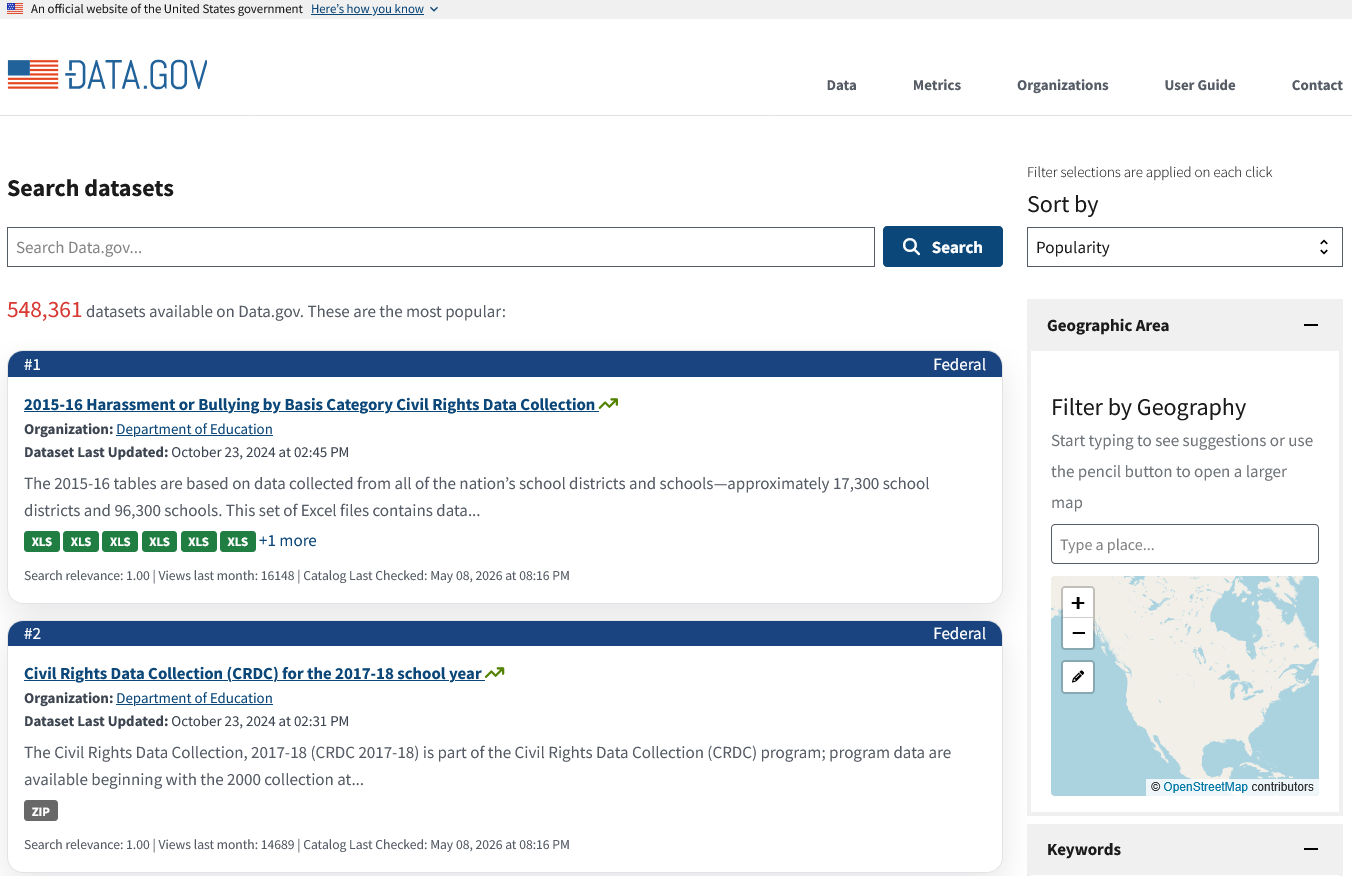
- The open source data portal software
- Original author: Open Knowledge Foundation
- Stable release: 2.12.1 / 28 October 2026; 3 days ago
- Written in: Python
- Available in: Multilingual
- License: AGPL
- Website: ckan.org
- Repository: github.com/ckan/ckan

The Comprehensive Knowledge Archive Network (CKAN) is an open-source open data portal for the storage and distribution of open data. Initially inspired by the package management capabilities of Debian Linux, CKAN has developed into a powerful data catalogue system that is mainly used by public institutions seeking to share their data with the general public.

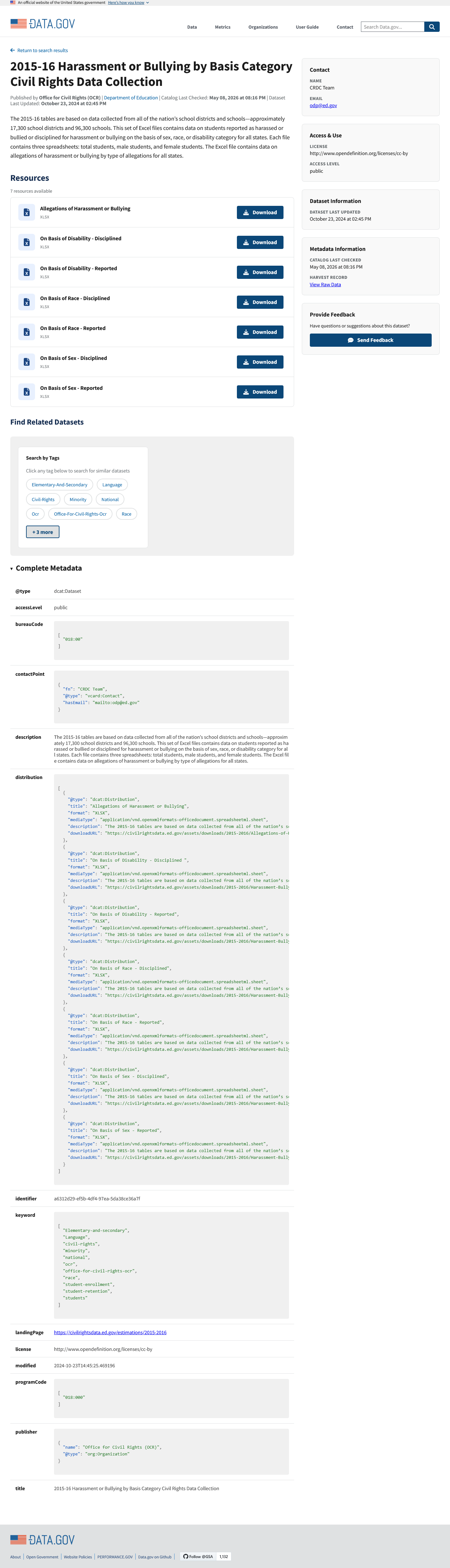
representative sample entry in Data.gov, which is an implementation of CKAN

Since its inception, CKAN has evolved and is a major open data platform software in the world, used by governments including the US and UK, to publish millions of public datasets.

Rufus Pollock developed its first version in 2005-2006. CKAN's codebase is maintained by the Open Knowledge Foundation.

The system is used both as a public platform on Datahub and in various government data catalogues, such as the UK's data.gov.uk, the Dutch National Data Register, the United States government's Data.gov and the Australian government's "Gov 2.0". The state government of South Australia also makes government data freely available to the public on the CKAN platform. The Italian government makes available the open data of the Data & Analytics Framework on the CKAN platform.

== Internal technology ==
CKAN's back end, the part running on the Web server, is written mainly in Python. The web pages it offers to users browsers include JavaScript. CKAN maintains information about the data sets to be offered to users in PostgreSQL databases. Searches are implemented by Solr. CKAN installations can be queried through Web APIs.

== Future of the project ==
The CKAN Stewardship proposal jointly put forward by Link Digital and Datopian received support from the Open Knowledge Foundation Board. In appointing joint stewardship put up jointly by Link Digital and Datopian, the Board felt there was a clear practical path with strong leadership and committed funding to see CKAN grow and prosper in the years to come. The Open Knowledge Foundation will remain the ‘purpose trustee’ to ensure the Stewards remain true to the purpose and ethos of the CKAN project.

== Similar projects and alternatives ==
- Piveau is the prevailing (meta)data management tool used by the EU.
  - A variant, HDEU-Hub, is specifically used for European health data
- Dataverse provides similar functions and is widely used for open data.
- DKAN is a Drupal-based open data portal based on CKAN.
