= The Open Definition =

Content shareability criterion

The Open content logo

The Open Definition (formerly Open Knowledge Definition) is published by the Open Knowledge Foundation (OKF) to define openness for any type of data, content, or other knowledge. The definition's stated purpose is to "[make] precise the meaning of ‘open’ with respect to knowledge". Although it draws philosophically from both the open-source and free software movements, the Open Definition prioritizes license compatibility over copyleft principles requiring derivative works to be released under a free license. The Open Definition contains requirements for content licenses to be considered open licenses, and the OKF maintains a list of compatible licenses. The definition also requires open access, machine readability, and the use of open formats. The OKF's Open Software Service Definition is derived from the Open Definition.

== Background ==
The Open Knowledge Foundation (OKF) is a United-Kingdom-based NGO that began work on the definition in 2006. According to the OKF, the Open Definition is "substantially derivative" of Bruce Perens' Open Source Definition and intends to continue Richard Stallman’s "ideals of software freedom". The Open Source Definition, which is the most widely used criteria for determining if a license is open source, is itself is derived from the Debian Free Software Guidelines. Although it is similar to David Wiley's defunct Open Content License (which allows retaining, revising, remixing, reusing, and redistributing open content works), the Open Definition is more specific. It is concerned with freedom of access and reuse, rather than open governance. The definition's stated purpose is to "[make] precise the meaning of ‘open’ with respect to knowledge".

== Content ==
The definition (version 2.1) contains the following summary: "Knowledge is open if anyone is free to access, use, modify, and share it—subject, at most, to measures that preserve provenance and openness". The previous version (1.0) stated that "A piece of content or data is open if anyone is free to use, reuse, and redistribute it — subject only, at most, to the requirement to attribute and/or share-alike." The new version makes it clear that using digital rights management (DRM) technology to reduce openness is not allowed.

The definition contains detailed criteria for open knowledge. In terms of open data, the definition covers the four main aspects:

- Open license—see below
- Open access—the full content must accessible for free or for no more than a one-time reasonable reproduction fee, "and should be downloadable via the Internet without charge".
- Machine readability—"The work must be provided in a form readily processable by a computer and where the individual elements of the work can be easily accessed and modified."
- The work must use an open format and be viewable and modifiable "with at least one free/libre/open-source software tool".

As such, the requirements of the Open Definition extend beyond open licensing by also requiring the elimination or reduction of technological barriers and pricing.

=== Licensing ===
The definition lists nine areas in which the license must be open and seven restrictions that may be placed on the content. The OKF maintains lists of compatible and incompatible licenses that can be applied to knowledge. As of 2017, it was recommending, in particular, six licenses. It would be possible to draft a bespoke license that met the definition, but this practice would likely lead to compatibility issues in the event of reuse. With the Open Definition, copyleft provisions—requiring reuse of content to be available under a free license—are allowed but not encouraged. The focus is more on license compatibility. Licenses that are noncommercial-only (prohibiting use of content for financial gain) or do not allow derivative works do not meet the Open Definition.

== Alternatives ==
Most of the community involved in open data supports the Open Definition over competing ones, such as that offered by the technology firm Gartner—which only covers use and redistribution. The value that the Open Definition provides as a standard is maintaining license compatibility and preventing the openness of data from being reduced by data sharing and reuse policies.

In contrast to some other definitions of open knowledge, the Open Definition requires freedom of reuse as well as freedom of access. Thus, many open access scientific publications do not meet the Open Definition.

== Derivatives ==
The OKF's Open Software Service Definition requires that the software service's code be free and open-source software and any non-personal data be available under the Open Definition. Lawyer Andrew Katz criticizes this definition for not doing enough to guarantee transparency and prevent vendor lock-in, which occurs when a company makes it deliberately difficult for users to switch to another service. He suggests that adding requirements for a fully documented and freely available API and bulk data export could mitigate lock-in.

== See also ==
- Berlin Declaration on Open Access to Knowledge in the Sciences and Humanities
- Budapest Open Access Initiative
- Definition of Free Cultural Works
- UNESCO 2012 Paris OER Declaration

== Sources ==
- Ciclosi, Francesco; Ceravolo, Paolo; Damiani, Ernesto; De, Ieso Donato (2019). "Assessing Compliance of Open Data in Politics with European Data Protection Regulation". Politics and Technology in the Post-Truth Era. Emerald Publishing Limited. pp. 89–114. ISBN 978-1-78756-984-3.
- Dalla Corte, Lorenzo; van Loenen, Bastiaan (2022). "Open Data and Public Sector Information". Elgar Encyclopedia of Law and Data Science. Edward Elgar Publishing. pp. 241–252. ISBN 978-1-83910-459-6.
- De Maria, Carmelo; Díaz Lantada, Andrés; Di Pietro, Licia; Ravizza, Alice; Ahluwalia, Arti (2022). "Open-Source Medical Devices: Concept, Trends, and Challenges Toward Equitable Healthcare Technology". Engineering Open-Source Medical Devices. Cham: Springer International Publishing. doi:10.1007/978-3-030-79363-0_1. ISBN 978-3-030-79362-3.
- Greenleaf, Graham; Lindsay, David (2018). Public Rights: Copyright's Public Domains. Cambridge University Press. ISBN 978-1-107-13406-5.
- Guy, Marieke (2016). "The Open Education Working Group: Bringing People, Projects and Data Together". Open Data for Education. Lecture Notes in Computer Science. Vol. 9500. Cham: Springer International Publishing. pp. 166–187. doi:10.1007/978-3-319-30493-9_9. ISBN 978-3-319-30492-2.
- Hamilton, Gill; Saunderson, Fred (2017). Open Licensing for Cultural Heritage. Facet Publishing. ISBN 978-1-78330-185-0.
- Katz, Andrew (2022). "Everything Open". Open Source Law, Policy and Practice. Oxford University Press. pp. 512–538. ISBN 978-0-19-260687-7.
- Langenkamp, Karin; Rödel, Bodo; Taufenbach, Kerstin; Weiland, Meike (2018). "Open Access in Vocational Education and Training Research". Publications. 6 (3). MDPI AG: 29. doi:10.3390/publications6030029. ISSN 2304-6775.
- Lund, Arwid; Zukerfeld, Mariano (2020). Corporate Capitalism's Use of Openness: Profit for Free?. Springer Nature. ISBN 978-3-030-28219-6.
- Martin, Victoria (2022). The Complete Guide to Open Scholarship. Bloomsbury Publishing. ISBN 979-8-216-06415-2.
- Smith, Matthew L.; Seward, Ruhiya Kristine (2020). "Updating Open Development: Open Practices in Inclusive Development". Making Open Development Inclusive. The MIT Press. doi:10.7551/mitpress/11635.003.0006. ISBN 978-0-262-35882-8.
- Stagars, Manuel (2016). Open Data in Southeast Asia: Towards Economic Prosperity, Government Transparency, and Citizen Participation in the ASEAN. Springer. ISBN 978-3-319-32170-7.
- Thompson, John K. (2023). Data for All. Simon and Schuster. ISBN 978-1-63343-877-4.
- Węcel, Krzysztof (2022). Big, Open and Linked Data: Effects and Value for the Economy. Springer Nature. ISBN 978-3-031-07147-8.
