= Public Sector Transparency Board =

The Public Sector Transparency Board was established by the prime minister of the United Kingdom, David Cameron, in June 2010 to drive forward the UK Government's transparency agenda. In November 2015, its functions were taken over by the Data Steering Group.

== Membership ==
The members of the board were:

- Francis Maude (chair), then Minister for the Cabinet Office
- Professor Sir Tim Berners-Lee
- Dr Rufus Pollock
- Professor Nigel Shadbolt
- Andrew Stott
- Dame Fiona Caldicott
- Professor Sir Mark Walport
- Steve Thomas
- Bill Roberts
- Professor David Rhind
- Stephan Shakespeare
- Heather Savory

== See also ==
- Open Data Institute
