= MirOS BSD =

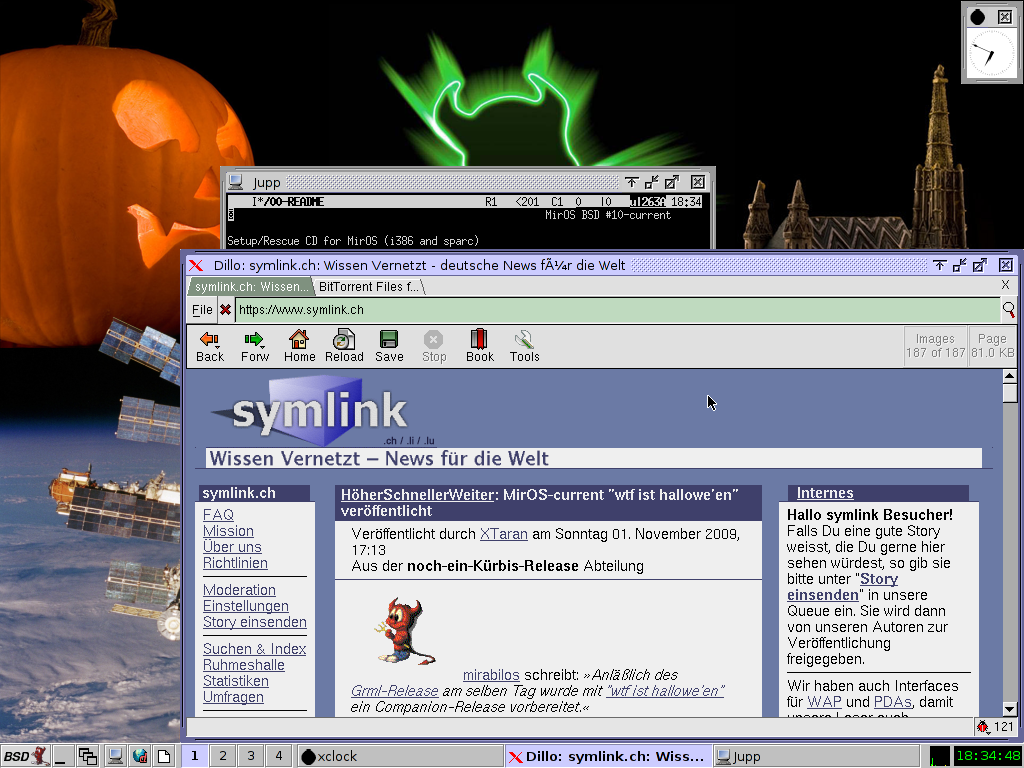
- Screenshot of MirOS #10-current/i386
- Developer: Thorsten Glaser, Benny Siegert, Ádám Hóka, others
- OS family: Unix, BSD
- Working state: Current
- Source model: Open source
- Initial release: OpenBSD-current-mirabilos #0 (October 11, 2002; 23 years ago)
- Latest release: MirOS #10semel (March 16, 2008; 18 years ago) [±]
- Latest preview: MirBSD-current (10uB4-20160117) (January 17, 2016; 10 years ago) [±]
- Update method: Binary security updates for stable releases
- Package manager: MirPorts, pkgsrc
- Supported platforms: i386, SPARC
- Kernel type: Monolithic
- Default user interface: mksh, IceWM, evilwm
- License: Mostly BSD, GPL, MirOS Licence
- Official website: www.mirbsd.org

MirOS BSD (originally called MirBSD) is a free and open source operating system which started as a fork of OpenBSD 3.1 in August 2002. It was intended to maintain the security of OpenBSD with better support for European localisation. Since then it has also incorporated code from other free BSD descendants, including NetBSD, MicroBSD (owned by DamnSmallBSD) and FreeBSD. Code from MirOS BSD was also incorporated into ekkoBSD, and when ekkoBSD ceased to exist, artwork, code and developers ended up working on MirOS BSD for a while.

Unlike the three major BSD distributions, MirOS BSD supports only the x86 and SPARC architectures.

== History ==
MirOS BSD originated as OpenBSD-current-mirabilos, an OpenBSD patchkit, but became a separate project after differences in opinion between the OpenBSD project leader Theo de Raadt and Thorsten Glaser. Despite the forking, MirOS BSD was synchronised with the ongoing development of OpenBSD, thus inheriting most of its good security history, as well as NetBSD and other BSD flavours.

One of the project's goals was to be able to port the MirOS userland to run on the Linux kernel, hence the deprecation of the MirBSD name in favour of MirOS. While MirOS Linux (linux kernel + BSD userland) was discussed by the developers sometime in 2004, it has not materialised. In 2026, the developer stated that while the project was still live, the OS shouldn't be run as primary OS.

== See also ==
- Comparison of BSD operating systems
