= Open Publication License =

Free-content license by Open Content Project

- Author: Eric S. Raymond, David A. Wiley, Tim O'Reilly
- Latest version: 1.0
- Publisher: Open Content Project
- Published: Current version: June 08, 1999
- SPDX identifier: OPUBL-1.0
- Debian FSG compatible: No
- FSF approved: Yes, under certain conditions (see below)
- OSI approved: No
- GPL compatible: No

The Open Publication License (OPL) was published by the Open Content Project in 1999 as a public copyright license for documents. It superseded the Open Content License, which was published by the Open Content Project in 1998. Starting around 2002–2003, it began to be superseded, in turn, by the Creative Commons licenses.

== History ==
In 1998, the Open Content Project published a licence called the Open Content License, which was among the first (perhaps the first) public copyright licenses intended for content (i.e. documents) rather than for software. The following year, it published the Open Publication License, which was intended to be an improvement upon the Open Content License.

The two licenses differ substantially: the Open Publication License is not a share-alike license while the Open Content License is; and the Open Publication License can optionally restrict the distribution of derivative works or restrict the commercial distribution of paper copies of the work or derivatives of the work, whereas the Open Content License forbids copying for profit altogether.

In June 2003, David A. Wiley, the founder of the Open Content Project, indicated that the Creative Commons licenses, which were developed in collaboration with lawyers, would be "more likely to stand up in court" than the Open Content Project licenses, which were not. He also announced that for this reason, he was joining Creative Commons and shutting down the Open Content Project, and that users thinking of using an Open Content Project license would be "far better off using a Creative Commons license".

== Nomenclature ==
Confusingly, the Open Content License gives its abbreviation as "OPL" rather than "OCL", and that license is sometimes referred to by the former initialism. ("OPL", as used by the Open Content Project in 1998, stood for OpenContent Principles and License.) Nevertheless, the license's author has subsequently referred to that license as the "OCL", and to the Open Publication License as the "OPL". This ambiguity about the initialism "OPL" risks confusion, and the only sure way to know which of the two licenses is being referred to, in a given context, is to look for the full name.

== Reception ==
According to the Free Software Foundation, the Open Publication License "can be used as a free documentation license" and is "a copyleft free documentation license provided the copyright holder does not exercise any of the 'LICENSE OPTIONS' listed in Section VI of the license." It is not, however, compatible with the GNU FDL.

In March 2004, the OPL v1.0 was determined by the Debian legal team to be incompatible with the Debian Free Software Guidelines.

In October 2004, an analysis of the Open Public License was published by Andrew M. St. Laurent, the author of Understanding Open Source and Free Software Licensing.

== Adoption ==
Eric S. Raymond's book The Cathedral and the Bazaar (1999) was published under the Open Publication License. Bruce Perens used the license for the Bruce Perens' Open Source Series of books. The Linux Gazette used the Open Publication License. Additionally, the Fedora project used the license for their documentation until approximately 2009-2010 when the project switched to a CC BY-SA license.

== See also ==
- David A. Wiley
- Category:Open Publication License-licensed works
