= Open knowledge =

Practice of sharing knowledge publicly and reusably

Open knowledge is interpreted broadly, including the production of open content (such as open data, open source software, open education resources, and open access), as well as practices (such as open research).

Explainer video: What is open knowledge? (A short history of copyright)

Open knowledge (or free knowledge) is knowledge that is free to use, reuse, and redistribute without legal, social, or technological restriction. Open knowledge organizations and activists have proposed principles and methodologies related to the production and distribution of knowledge in an open manner.

The concept is related to open source and the Open Definition, whose first versions bore the title "Open Knowledge Definition", is derived from the Open Source Definition.

== History ==
=== Early history ===
Similarly to other "open" concepts, though the term is rather new, the concept is old: One of the earliest surviving printed texts, a copy of the Buddhist Diamond Sutra produced in China around 868 AD, contains a dedication "for universal free distribution". In the fourth volume of the Encyclopédie, Denis Diderot allowed re-use of his work in return for him having used material from other authors.

=== Twentieth century ===
In the early twentieth century, a debate about intellectual property rights developed within the German Social Democratic Party. A key contributor was Karl Kautsky who in 1902 devoted a section of a pamphlet to "intellectual production", which he distinguished from material production:

Communism in material production, anarchy in the intellectual that is the type of a Socialist mode of production, as it will develop from the rule of the proletariat—in other words, from the Social Revolution through the logic of economic facts, whatever might be: the wishes, intentions, and theories of the proletariat.

This view was based on an analysis according to which Karl Marx's law of value only affected material production, not intellectual production.

With the development of the public Internet from the early 1990s, it became far easier to copy and share information across the world. The phrase "information wants to be free" became a rallying cry for people who wanted to create an Internet without the commercial barriers that they felt inhibited creative expression in traditional material production. Digital rights activists aim to enable related concepts, including access to data produced with public funds and freedom of expression online.

Wikipedia was founded in 2001 with the ethos of providing information which could be edited and modified to improve its quality. The success of Wikipedia became instrumental in making open knowledge something that millions of people interacted with and contributed to.

== Organisations and activities promoting open knowledge ==
- Open Knowledge Foundation
- OpenStreetMap
- Scholarly Publishing and Academic Resources Coalition (SPARC)
- Science Commons
- Wikimedia Foundation
