= Information wants to be free =

Phrase

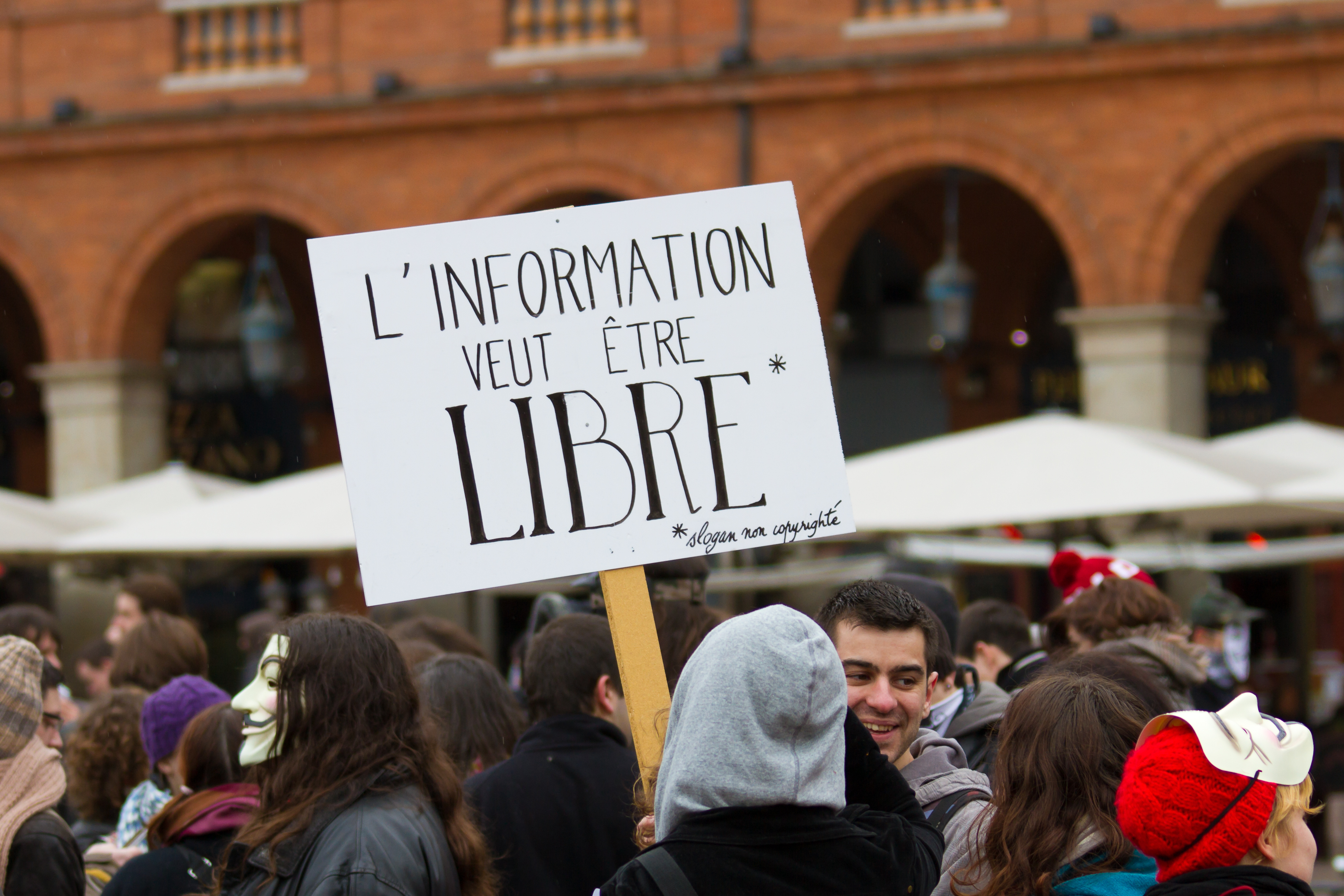
Sign which says “Information Wants to be Free”, held at an anti-ACTA protest in Toulouse, France.

"Information wants to be free" is an expression that means either that all people should be able to access information freely, or that information (formulated as an actor) naturally strives to become as freely available among people as possible. It is used by technology activists to criticize laws that limit transparency and general access to information. Critics of intellectual property law say the system of such government-granted monopolies conflicts with the development of a public domain of information. The expression is often credited to Stewart Brand, who was recorded saying it at a Hackers Conference in 1984.

== History ==
The phrase is attributed to Stewart Brand, who, in the late 1960s, founded the Whole Earth Catalog and argued that technology could be liberating rather than oppressing. What is considered the earliest recorded occurrence of the expression was at the first Hackers Conference in 1984, although the video recording of the conversation shows that what Brand actually said is slightly different. Brand told Steve Wozniak:

On the one hand you have—the point you’re making Woz—is that information sort of wants to be expensive because it is so valuable—the right information in the right place just changes your life. On the other hand, information almost wants to be free because the costs of getting it out is getting lower and lower all of the time. So you have these two things fighting against each other.

Brand's conference remarks are transcribed accurately by Joshua Gans in his research on the quote as used by Steve Levy in his own history of the phrase.

A later form appears in his The Media Lab: Inventing the Future at MIT:

Information Wants To Be Free. Information also wants to be expensive. ...That tension will not go away.

According to historian Adrian Johns, the slogan expresses a view that had already been articulated in the mid-20th century by Norbert Wiener, Michael Polanyi and Arnold Plant, who advocated for the free communication of scientific knowledge, and specifically criticized the patent system.

== Cypherpunk ==
Brand's attribution of will to an abstract human construct (information) has been adopted within a branch of the cypherpunk movement, whose members espouse a particular political viewpoint of anarchism. The construction of the statement takes its meaning beyond the simple judgmental observation, "Information should be free", by acknowledging that the internal force or entelechy of information and knowledge makes it essentially incompatible with notions of proprietary software, copyrights, patents, subscription services, etc. They believe that information is dynamic, ever-growing and evolving and cannot be contained within (any) ideological structure.

According to this philosophy, hackers, crackers, and phreakers are liberators of information which is being held hostage by agents demanding money for its release. Other participants in this network include cypherpunks who educate people to use public-key cryptography to protect the privacy of their messages from corporate or governmental snooping and programmers who write free software and open source code. Still others create Free-Nets allowing users to gain access to computer resources for which they would otherwise need an account. They might also break copyright law by swapping music, movies, or other copyrighted materials over the Internet.

Chelsea Manning is alleged to have said "Information should be free" to Adrian Lamo when explaining a rationale for US government documents to be released to WikiLeaks. The narrative goes on with Manning wondering if she is a "'hacker', 'cracker', 'hacktivist', 'leaker' or what".

== Literary usage ==
In the "Fall Revolution" series of science-fiction books, author Ken Macleod riffs and puns on the expression by writing about entities composed of information actually "wanting", as in desiring, freedom and the machinations of several human characters with differing political and ideological agendas, to facilitate or disrupt these entities' quest for freedom.

In the Warcross duology by Marie Lu, the virtual space "The Pirate's Den" sports the slogan.

In the cyberpunk world of post-singularity transhuman culture described by Charles Stross in his books like Accelerando and Singularity Sky, the wish of information to be free is a law of nature.

== See also ==
- Crypto-anarchism
- Culture vs. Copyright
- Cypherpunk
- Free content
- Free culture movement
- Freedom of information
- Free Haven Project
- Freenet
- Free software
- Hacktivism
- Hacktivismo
- Horror vacui (physics)
- Information activist
- Information Doesn't Want to Be Free
- Internet censorship
- Internet privacy
- Openness
- Paywall
- Streisand effect
- Tor (anonymity network)
- Transparency
