= Against DRM license =

Free copyleft license with a clause against digital rights management for artworks

Against DRM 2.0 is a free copyleft license for artworks. It is the first free content license that contains a clause about related rights and a clause against digital rights management (DRM).

The first clause authorizes the licensee to exercise related rights, while the second clause prevents the use of DRM. If the licensor uses DRM, the license is not applicable to the work; if the licensee uses DRM, license is automatically void.

According to Internet Archive, the first version of the Against DRM 2.0 license was published in 2006.
