= Patentleft =

Royalty-free patent licensing

Patentleft is the practice of licensing patents (especially biological patents) for royalty-free use, on the condition that adopters license related improvements they develop under the same terms. Copyleft-style licensors seek "continuous growth of a universally accessible technology commons" from which they, and others, will benefit.

Patentleft is analogous to copyleft, a licensing mechanism that allows distribution of a copyrighted work and derived works, but only under the same or equivalent terms.

== Uses ==
The Biological Innovation for Open Society (BiOS) project implemented a patentleft system to encourage re-contribution and collaborative innovation of their technology. BiOS holds patented technology for transferring genes in plants, and licenses the technology under the terms that, if a license holder improves the gene transfer tool and patents the improvement, then their improvement must be made available to all the other license holders.

The open patent idea is designed to be practiced by consortia of research-oriented companies and increasingly by standards bodies. These also commonly use open trademark methods to ensure some compliance with a suite of compatibility tests, e.g. Java, X/Open both of which forbid the use of the mark by the non-compliant.

On October 12, 2001, the Free Software Foundation and Finite State Machine Labs Inc. (FSMLabs) announced a GPL-compliant open-patent license for FSMLabs' software patent, US 5995745. Titled the Open RTLinux patent license Version 2, it provides for usage of this patent in accordance with the GPL.

== See also ==
- Copyleft
- Open content
- Open Invention Network
- Open Patent Alliance
- Open source
- Patent troll
- Public domain
- Software patent
- Viral license
