= Open Content License =

Free-content license by Open Content Project

- Author: David A. Wiley
- Latest version: 1.0
- Publisher: Open Content Project
- Published: Current version: July 14, 1998
- OSI approved: No

The Open Content License is a share-alike public copyright license by Open Content Project in 1998. The license can be applied to a work to make it open content. It is one of the earliest non-software free content licenses.

== History and reception ==
The Open Content License, dated July 14, 1998, predates the GNU Free Documentation License (GFDL) and other non-software public licenses. Though discussions were held between David A. Wiley, creator of the Open Content License, and Richard Stallman, leader of the Free Software Foundation, who created the GNU General Public License for software and would create the GFDL. The license text is titled "OpenContent License (OPL)". "OPL" stood for OpenContent Principles and License.

This license is not compatible with most other licenses (beside permissive licenses) in that it requires derivative works to be licensed under the Open Content License (Viral license). With the exception of media and handling costs, it forbids charging for copies of a licensed work, but does not otherwise forbid commercial use.

Another license released a year later, also by the Open Content Project, is called the Open Publication License. The OpenContent as well as the Open Publication license were succeeded by the Creative Commons licenses in 2003.

A project licensed under the OPL is Open Icecat, which was launched in 2005 as a global open catalogue for e-commerce, and is embraced by the tech sector.
