= Korean Open Access License =

Copyleft license based on South Korean law

Banner of Korean Open Access License

Korean Open Access License (KOAL; Korean: 정보공유라이선스; Hanja: 情報共有라이선스) is a copyleft license developed by IPLeft in South Korea based on South Korean law, which enable authors to give different kind of permission to others.

== Types ==
There are four types of license in KOAL 2.0:

- Permissive: No restriction on purpose of usage and derivative works. (known as Commercial-Derivative works in 1.0)
- NoCommercial: Cannot be used in for-profit purpose. No restriction on derivative works. (known as NoCommercial-Derivative works in 1.0)
- NoDerivatives: No restriction on purpose of usage. No derivative works allowed. (known as Commercial-NoDerivatives in 1.0)
- NoCommercial-NoDerivatives: Cannot be used in for-profit purpose. No derivative works allowed. (known as NoCommercial-NoDerivatives in 1.0)
