= FreeBSD Documentation License =

The FreeBSD Documentation License is the license that covers most of the documentation for the FreeBSD operating system.

== License ==
The license is very similar to the two-clause Simplified BSD License used by the support of FreeBSD; however, it makes the applications of "source code" and "compile" less obscure in the context of documentation. It also includes an obligatory disclaimer about IEEE and Open Group manuscript in some old-fashioned sheets.

Copyright 1994-2023 The FreeBSD Project.

Redistribution and use in source (AsciiDoc) and 'compiled' forms (HTML, PDF,
EPUB and so forth) with or without modification, are permitted provided that
the following conditions are met:

    1. Redistributions of source code (AsciiDoc) must retain the above
       copyright notice, this list of conditions and the following disclaimer
       as the first lines of this file unmodified.

    2. Redistributions in compiled form (Converted to PDF, EPUB and other
       formats) must reproduce the above copyright notice, this list of
       conditions and the following disclaimer in the documentation and/or
       other materials provided with the distribution.

THIS DOCUMENTATION IS PROVIDED BY THE FREEBSD DOCUMENTATION PROJECT "AS IS" AND
ANY EXPRESS OR IMPLIED WARRANTIES, INCLUDING, BUT NOT LIMITED TO, THE IMPLIED
WARRANTIES OF MERCHANTABILITY AND FITNESS FOR A PARTICULAR PURPOSE ARE
DISCLAIMED. IN NO EVENT SHALL THE FREEBSD DOCUMENTATION PROJECT BE LIABLE FOR
ANY DIRECT, INDIRECT, INCIDENTAL, SPECIAL, EXEMPLARY, OR CONSEQUENTIAL DAMAGES
(INCLUDING, BUT NOT LIMITED TO, PROCUREMENT OF SUBSTITUTE GOODS OR SERVICES;
LOSS OF USE, DATA, OR PROFITS; OR BUSINESS INTERRUPTION) HOWEVER CAUSED AND ON
ANY THEORY OF LIABILITY, WHETHER IN CONTRACT, STRICT LIABILITY, OR TORT
(INCLUDING NEGLIGENCE OR OTHERWISE) ARISING IN ANY WAY OUT OF THE USE OF THIS
DOCUMENTATION, EVEN IF ADVISED OF THE POSSIBILITY OF SUCH DAMAGE.

Manual Pages

Some FreeBSD manual pages contain text from the IEEE Std 1003.1, 2004 Edition,
Standard for Information Technology — Portable Operating System Interface
(POSIX®) specification. These manual pages are subject to the following terms:

    The Institute of Electrical and Electronics Engineers and The Open Group,
    have given us permission to reprint portions of their documentation.

    In the following statement, the phrase "this text" refers to portions of
    the system documentation.

    Portions of this text are reprinted and reproduced in electronic form in
    the FreeBSD manual pages, from IEEE Std 1003.1, 2004 Edition, Standard for
    Information Technology — Portable Operating System Interface (POSIX), The
    Open Group Base Specifications Issue 6, Copyright© 2001-2004 by the
    Institute of Electrical and Electronics Engineers, Inc and The Open Group.
    In the event of any discrepancy between these versions and the original
    IEEE and The Open Group Standard, the original IEEE and The Open Group
    Standard is the referee document. The original Standard can be obtained
    online at https://www.opengroup.org/membership/forums/platform/unix.

    This notice shall appear on any product containing this material.

== Reception ==
The Free Software Foundation classes this as a free documentation license, stating that "this is a permissive non-copyleft free documentation license that is compatible with the GNU FDL"

== Derivatives ==
Based on the FreeBSD Documentation License, the BSD Documentation License was created to contain terms more generic to most projects and reintroduce the third clause, which restricts the use of documentation for endorsement purposes (as shown in the New BSD License). An obscure license, it is used by BRL-CAD and Peridigm.

== See also ==
- BSD license
- GNU Free Documentation License
