= Benjamin Mako Hill =

Debian hacker, intellectual property researcher, activist and author

- Benjamin Mako Hill in 2013
- Education: Hampshire College (BA); Massachusetts Institute of Technology (MS, PhD)
- Occupation: Associate Professor
- Employer: University of Washington
- Spouse: Mika Matsuzaki (m. 2006)
- Website: mako.cc

Benjamin Mako Hill (/ˈbɛndʒəmɪn ˈmeɪkoʊ hɪl/) is a free software activist, hacker, author, and professor. He is a contributor and free software developer as part of the Debian and Ubuntu projects as well as the co-author of technical manuals on the subject including The Official Ubuntu Server Book (2010), The Official Ubuntu Book (2006), and Debian GNU/Linux 3.1 Bible (2005).

Hill is an associate professor in Communication at the University of Washington.

== Biography ==
Hill has an undergraduate degree in Literature & Technology from Hampshire College, a master's degree from the MIT Media Lab, and a PhD in an interdepartmental program involving the MIT Sloan School of Management and the MIT Media Lab. As of fall 2013, he is an assistant professor in the Department of Communication at the University of Washington. He is also a Fellow at the MIT Center for Civic Media where he coordinates the development of software for civic organizing. He has worked as an advisor and contractor for the One Laptop per Child project. He is a speaker for the GNU Project, and serves on the board of Software Freedom International (the organization that organizes Software Freedom Day). In 2006, he married Mika Matsuzaki and used mathematically constrained wedding vows at the marriage ceremony.

== Debian ==
Since 1999, Hill has been an active member of Debian. He has served as a delegate of the Debian Project Leader, and is a founder and coordinator of Debian Non-Profit, a Debian custom distribution designed to fill the needs of small non-profit organizations. In addition he served on the board of Software in the Public Interest from March 2003 until July 2006, serving as the organisation's vice-president from August 2004.

== Ubuntu ==
Hill is also a core developer and founding member of Ubuntu, and continues to be an active contributor to the project. In addition to technical responsibilities, he coordinated the construction of a community around the Ubuntu Project as project "community manager" (later ceding the role to Jono Bacon) during Ubuntu's first year and a half. During this period, he worked full-time for Canonical Ltd. Within the Project, he served on the "Community Council" governance board that oversees all non-technical aspects of the project, until October 2011. His work included contributing to a code of conduct and diversity statement for the project.

Hill co-authored the 2006 book, "The Official Ubuntu Book" and the 2010 book "The Official Ubuntu Server Book".

== University of Washington ==
Hill has been a faculty member in the University of Washington's Department of Communication since 2013. He is a recipient of the NSF CAREER Award and member of the Community Data Science Collective.

== Other work ==
In addition to software development, Hill writes extensively. He has been published in academic books and magazines, newsletters, and online journals, and Slate Magazine republished one of his blog posts. He is the author of the Free Software Project Management HOWTO, the canonical document on managing Free and open-source software (FOSS) projects, and has published academic work on FOSS from anthropological, sociological, management and software engineering perspectives and has written and spoken about intellectual property, copyright, and collaboration more generally. He has also studied the sociology of community involvement in web communities, and been published and cited about projects like Scratch and Wikipedia. He has talked about these topics publicly, as well as giving a keynote address at 2008 OSCON.

Hill has worked for several years as a consultant for FOSS projects specializing in coordinating releases of software as free or open software and structuring development efforts to encourage community involvement. He spends a significant amount of his time traveling and giving talks on FOSS and intellectual property primarily in Europe and North America.

Hill earlier pursued research full-time as a graduate researcher at the MIT Media Laboratory. At the lab, he has worked in both the Electronic Publishing and Computing Culture groups on collaborative writing and decision-making software. One project, Selectricity is a voting tool which received prizes and grants from MTV and Cisco. He was a fellow at the Harvard Berkman Center for Internet & Society and the MIT Center for Civic Media.

He served on the advisory board of the Wikimedia Foundation, the advisory council of the Open Knowledge Foundation and the board of the Free Software Foundation. He was a founding member of the Ubuntu Community Council in 2009.

== Awards ==
2018-2019 Fellow at the Center for Advanced Study in the Social and Behavioral Sciences

2019 Research Symbiont Award—General Symbiont

== Bibliography ==
- The Official Ubuntu Server Book. 2010. ISBN 978-0133017533
- The Official Ubuntu Book. 2006. ISBN 978-0-13-243594-9
- Debian GNU/Linux 3.1 Bible. 2005. ISBN 978-0-7645-7644-7
