= Free Art License =

Type of free content license

Free Art License (Licence Art Libre)
- Logo
- Latest version: 1.3
- Publisher: Copyleft Attitude
- Published: 8 April 2007
- FSF approved: Yes
- GPL compatible: No (for possible exceptions see § Compatibility)
- Copyleft: Yes
- Website: artlibre.org

The Free Art License (FAL) (French: Licence Art Libre, LAL) is a copyleft license that grants the right to freely copy, distribute, and transform creative works except for computer hardware and software, including for commercial use.

== History ==
The license was written in July 2000, with contributions from the mailing list copyleft_attitude@april.org and, in particular, with French lawyers Mélanie Clément-Fontaine and David Geraud, and French artists Isabelle Vodjdani and Antoine Moreau. It followed meetings held by Copyleft Attitude Antoine Moreau, with the artists gathered around the magazine Allotopie: Francis Deck, Antonio Gallego, Roberto Martinez, and Emma Gall. They took place at "Accès Local" in January 2000 and "Public" in March 2000, two places of contemporary art in Paris.

In 2005, Moreau wrote a memoir edited by Liliane Terrier entitled in French: Le copyleft appliqué à la création artistique. Le collectif Copyleft Attitude et la Licence Art Libre (Copyleft applied to artistic creation. The Copyleft Attitude collective and the Free Art License).

In 2007, version 1.3 of the Free Art License was amended to provide greater legal certainty and optimum compatibility with other copyleft licenses.

== Application ==
The license was inspired by FLOSS licenses and issues related but not exclusive to digital arts:

It was born out of the observation of the world of free software and the Internet, but its applicability is not limited to digital support.

Version 1.1 was adopted by art organizations like Constant (Brussels) and was translated into English by artist and technologist Antoine Schmitt. The Open Definition website of the Open Knowledge Foundation lists FAL 1.2 and 1.3 as one of the licenses conformant with the principles outlined in the Open Definition.

== Compatibility ==
The Free Art License 1.3 has been declared compatible with CC BY-SA 4.0, but incompatible with the GNU GPL. It is recommended by the Free Software Foundation in the following terms: "We don't take the position that artistic or entertainment works must be free, but if you want to make one free, we recommend the Free Art License."

=== Compatibility with CC BY-SA 4.0 ===
The Free Art License 1.3 is equivalent to the Creative Commons Attribution-ShareAlike (CC BY-SA) 4.0 license.

On October 21, 2014, after public discussions, the Copyleft Attitude collective announced that the Free Art License is now legally compatible with the Creative Commons Attribution-Share Alike 4.0 International (CC BY-SA 4.0) license. The Creative Commons organization warmly welcomed this decision as it had defended this compatibility since the beginning.

== See also ==
- Share-alike
