= The Open Source Definition =

1998 Open Source Initiative policy document

The Open Source Definition (OSD) is a policy document published by the Open Source Initiative in 1998. Derived from the Debian Free Software Guidelines written by Bruce Perens, the OSD is the predominant standard for open-source software. The definition has ten criteria, such as requiring freely accessed source code and granting the open-source rights to everyone who receives a copy of the program. Covering both copyleft and permissive licenses, it is effectively identical to the definition of free software, but motivated by more pragmatic and business-friendly considerations. The Open Source Initiative's board votes on proposals of licenses to certify that they are compliant with the definition, and maintains a list of compliant licenses on its website. The definition has been adapted into the Open Knowledge Foundation's Open Definition for open knowledge and into open hardware definitions.

== History ==
There have been several attempts to define open source and free software. Amongst the earliest was Free Software Foundation's Free Software Definition, which then defined as the Three Freedoms of Free Software (Freedom Zero was added later). Published versions of FSF's Free Software Definition existed as early as 1986, having been published in the first edition of the (now defunct) GNU's Bulletin.

=== Debian Free Software Guidelines ===
The Debian Free Software Guidelines (DFSG) was first published together with the first version of the Debian Social Contract in July 1997. The primary author was Bruce Perens, with input from the Debian developers during a month-long discussion on a private mailing list, as part of the larger Debian Social Contract. Perens was copied to an email discussion between Ean Schuessler (then of Debian) and Donnie Barnes of Red Hat, in which Schuessler accused Red Hat of never elucidating its social contract with the Linux community. Perens realized that Debian did not have any formal social contract either, and immediately started creating one. The (then) Three Freedoms, which preceded the drafting and promulgation of the DFSG, were unknown to its authors.

The guidelines were:

1. Free redistribution.
2. Inclusion of source code.
3. Allowing for modifications and derived works.
4. Integrity of the author's source code (as a compromise).
5. No discrimination against persons or groups.
6. No discrimination against fields of endeavor, like commercial use.
7. The license needs to apply to all to whom the program is redistributed.
8. License must not be specific to a product.
9. License must not restrict other software.
10. Example licenses: The GNU GPL, BSD, and Artistic licenses are examples of licenses considered free.

=== Open source ===
As Netscape released the open-source Mozilla browser in 1998, Bruce Perens again drafted a set of open-source guidelines to go with the release. It has been claimed that the Open Source Definition was created by re-titling the exact text of the DFSG.

A modified version of this definition was adopted by the Open Source Initiative (OSI) as the Open Source Definition. The OSI uses the label "open source", rather than "free software", because it felt that the latter term had undesirable ideological and political freight, and it wanted to focus on the pragmatic and business-friendly arguments for open-source software. It adopted a closed rather than membership-driven organizational model in order to draft the definition and work together with a wider variety of stakeholders than other free or open-source projects.

Once the DFSG became the Open Source Definition, Richard Stallman saw the need to differentiate free software from open source and promoted the Free Software Definition.

=== Debian diverges ===
In November 1998, Ian Jackson and others proposed several changes in a draft versioned 1.4, but the changes were never made official. Jackson stated that the problems were "loose wording" and the patch clause.

The Debian General Resolution 2004-003, titled "Editorial amendments to the social contract", modified the Social Contract. The proposer Andrew Suffield stated:

"The rule is 'this resolution only changes the letter of the law, not the spirit'. Mostly it changes the wording of the social contract to better reflect what it is supposed to mean, and this is mostly in light of issues that were not considered when it was originally written."

However, the change of the sentence "We promise to keep the Debian GNU/Linux Distribution entirely free software" into "We promise that the Debian system and all its components will be free" resulted in the release manager, Anthony Towns, making a practical change:

"As [SC #1] is no longer limited to 'software', and as this decision was made by developers after and during discussion of how we should consider non-software content such as documentation and firmware, I don't believe I can justify the policy decisions to exempt documentation, firmware, or content any longer, as the Social Contract has been amended to cover all these areas."

This prompted another General Resolution, 2004–004, in which the developers voted overwhelmingly against immediate action, and decided to postpone those changes until the next release (whose development started a year later, in June 2005).

== Criteria ==
Providing access to the source code is not enough for software to be considered "open-source". The Open Source Definition requires that ten criteria be met:

1. Free redistribution
2. Source code must be accessible and the license must permit redistribution in the form of source code (rather than object code). In order to modify the software, access to source code is required.
3. Derivative works must be allowed and able to be redistributed under the same licensing terms as the open-source product
4. The license may require that the original software be distributed intact, but only if modifications are able to be distributed as patches without restriction.
5. No discrimination between users
6. No discrimination between uses, including commercial use
7. Everyone who receives a copy of the program is granted all the open-source rights
8. The license must cover all the code, not a particular product or distribution.
9. There may not be restrictions on other software distributed at the same time
10. Technological neutrality—cannot restrict use to any particular technology. For example, a license that requires a user to click a box agreeing to it is not free because the work cannot be distributed as a paper copy.

The Open Source Definition is available under a Creative Commons (CC BY 4.0) license. It covers both copyleft—where redistribution and derivative works must be released under a free license—and permissive licenses—where derivative works can be released under any license. It is part of the open source movement rather than the free software movement, and seeks to promote the availability of open-source software for anyone seeking to reuse it, even the makers of proprietary software. It does not address warranty disclaimers, although these are very common in open-source software. The definition does not specify a governance structure for open-source projects.

== Compliant licenses ==
The criteria are used by the OSI to approve certain licenses as compatible with the definition, and maintain a list of compliant licenses. New licenses have to submit a formal proposal that is discussed by the OSI mailing list before it is approved or rejected by the OSI board. Seven approved licenses are particularly recommended by the OSI as "popular, widely used, or having strong communities":

- Apache License 2.0
- BSD 3-Clause and BSD 2-Clause Licenses
- All versions of the GNU General Public License
- All versions of the GNU Lesser Public License
- MIT License
- Mozilla Public License 2.0
- Common Development and Distribution License (CDDL)
- Eclipse Public License version 2.0

== Application ==
=== Software ===
Most discussions about the DFSG happen on the debian-legal mailing list. When a Debian Developer first uploads a package for inclusion in Debian, the ftpmaster team checks the software licenses and determines whether they are in accordance with the social contract. The team sometimes confers with the debian-legal list in difficult cases.

=== Non-"software" content ===
The DFSG is focused on software, but the word itself is unclear—some apply it to everything that can be expressed as a stream of bits, while a minority considers it to refer to just computer programs. Also, the existence of PostScript, executable scripts, sourced documents, etc., greatly muddies the second definition. Thus, to break the confusion, in June 2004 the Debian project decided to explicitly apply the same principles to software documentation, multimedia data and other content. The non-program content of Debian began to comply with the DFSG more strictly in Debian 4.0 (released in April 2007) and subsequent releases.

=== GFDL ===
Much documentation written by the GNU Project, the Linux Documentation Project and others licensed under the GNU Free Documentation License contain invariant sections, which do not comply with the DFSG. This assertion is the end result of a long discussion and the General Resolution 2006-001.

Due to the GFDL invariant sections, content under this license must be separately contained in an additional "non-free" repository which is not officially considered part of Debian.

=== Multimedia files ===
It can be sometimes hard to define what constitutes the "source" for multimedia files, such as whether an uncompressed image file is the source of a compressed image and whether the 3D model before ray tracing is the source for its resulting image.

== debian-legal tests for DFSG compliance ==
The debian-legal mailing list subscribers have created some tests to check whether a license violates the DFSG. The common tests (as described in the draft DFSG FAQ) are the following:

- "The Desert Island test". Imagine a castaway on a desert island with a solar-powered computer. This would make it impossible to fulfill any requirement to make changes publicly available or to send patches to some particular place. This holds even if such requirements are only upon request, as the castaway might be able to receive messages but be unable to send them. To be free, software must be modifiable by this unfortunate castaway, who must also be able to legally share modifications with friends on the island.
- "The Dissident test". Consider a dissident in a totalitarian state who wishes to share a modified bit of software with fellow dissidents, but does not wish to reveal the identity of the modifier, or directly reveal the modifications themselves, or even possession of the program, to the government. Any requirement for sending source modifications to anyone other than the recipient of the modified binary—in fact, any forced distribution at all, beyond giving source to those who receive a copy of the binary—would put the dissident in danger. For Debian to consider software free it must not require any such excess distribution.
- "The Tentacles of Evil test". Imagine that the author is hired by a large evil corporation and, now in their thrall, attempts to do the worst to the users of the program: to make their lives miserable, to make them stop using the program, to expose them to legal liability, to make the program non-free, to discover their secrets, etc. The same can happen to a corporation bought out by a larger corporation bent on destroying free software in order to maintain its monopoly and extend its evil empire. To be free, the license cannot allow even the author to take away the required freedoms.

== Reception ==
The Open Source Definition is the most widely used definition for open-source software, and is often used as a standard for whether a project is open source. It and the official definitions of free software by the Free Software Foundation (FSF) essentially cover the same software licenses. Nevertheless, there is a values difference between the free software and open source movements: the former is more based on ethics and values, the latter on pragmatism.

=== Derived definitions ===
The Open Knowledge Foundation's Open Definition is substantially derivative of the Open Source Definition.

The Open Source Hardware Statement of Principles is adapted from the Open Source Definition.

== See also ==
- Comparison of free and open-source software licenses
- History of free and open-source software
- The Free Software Definition
