= Open Database License =

Share-alike license for databases

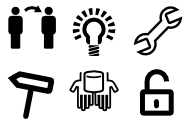
- Summary icons of the license
- Author: Open Data Commons
- Latest version: v 1.0
- Publisher: Open Knowledge Foundation
- SPDX identifier: ODbL-1.0
- Copyleft: Yes
- Website: opendatacommons.org/licenses/odbl/

The Open Database License (ODbL) is a copyleft license agreement intended to allow users to freely share, modify, and use a database while maintaining this same freedom for others.

ODbL is published by Open Data Commons, which is part of Open Knowledge Foundation.

The ODbL was created with the goal of allowing users to share their data freely without worrying about problems relating to copyright or ownership. It allows users to freely use the data in the database, including in other databases; edit existing data in the database; and add new data to the database. The license establishes the rights of users of the database, as well as the correct procedure for attributing credit where credit is due for the data, and how to make changes or improvements in the data, thus simplifying the sharing and comparison of data.

== Freedoms ==
- To Share: To copy, distribute and use the database.
- To Create: To produce works from the database.
- To Adapt: To modify, transform and build upon the database.

== Conditions ==
- Attribute: You must attribute any public use of the database, or works produced from the database, in the manner specified in the ODbL. For any use or redistribution of the database, or works produced from it, you must make clear to others the license of the database and keep intact any notices on the original database.
- Share-Alike: If you publicly use any adapted version of this database, or works produced from an adapted database, you must also offer that adapted database under the ODbL.
- Keep open: If you redistribute the database, or an adapted version of it, then you may use technological measures that restrict the work (such as digital rights management) as long as you also redistribute a version without such measures.

== Notable uses ==
The OpenStreetMap (OSM) project completed the move from a Creative Commons license to ODbL in September 2012 in an attempt to have more legal security and a more specific license for databases rather than creative works.

Other projects using ODbL include OpenCorporates, Open Data Blend, Open Food Facts, Paris OpenData, and Overture Maps.

== See also ==
- Sui generis database right
- Linux Foundation § Community Data License Agreement (CDLA)
