= Open Knowledge Foundation =

Non-profit organisation promoting free and reusable access to knowledge

- Abbreviation: OKF
- Formation: 20 May 2004 (22 years ago)
- Founder: Rufus Pollock
- Type: Nonprofit organisation
- VAT ID no.: GB 984404989
- Registration no.: 05133759
- Purpose: Open knowledge broadly, including open access, open content, open science and open data
- Headquarters: 86-90 Paul Street, London, EC2A 4NE, United Kingdom
- CEO: Renata Ávila Pinto
- Website: okfn.org

Open Knowledge Foundation (OKF) is a global, non-profit network that promotes and shares information at no charge, including both content and data. It was founded by Rufus Pollock on 20 May 2004 in Cambridge, England. It is incorporated in England and Wales as a private company limited by guarantee. Between May 2016 and May 2019 the organisation was named Open Knowledge International, but decided in May 2019 to return to Open Knowledge Foundation.

== Aims ==
The aims of Open Knowledge Foundation are:

- Promoting the idea of open knowledge, both what it is, and why it is a good idea.
- Running open knowledge events, such as OKCon.
- Working on open knowledge projects, such as Open Economics or Open Shakespeare.
- Providing infrastructure, and potentially a home, for open knowledge projects, communities and resources. For example, the KnowledgeForge service and CKAN.
- Acting at UK, European and international levels on open knowledge issues.

== People ==
Renata Ávila Pinto joined as CEO of the Open Knowledge Foundation in October 2021. From February 2019 to August 2020, Catherine Stihler was CEO, and left to become CEO of Creative Commons. Between 2015–2017, Pavel Richter took on the role of CEO of Open Knowledge Foundation, having been executive director of Wikimedia Deutschland.

The Open Knowledge Foundation Advisory Council includes people from the areas of open access, open data, open content, open science, data visualization and digital rights. In 2015, it consisted of:

- Andrew Stott
- Becky Hogge
- Benjamin Mako Hill
- Carolina Rossini
- Christopher Corbin
- Daniel Dietrich
- Denis Parfenov
- Peter Murray-Rust
- Sören Auer
- Glyn Moody
- Hannes Gassert
- Lynn M.Combs-Heard
- Jordan S. Hatcher
- Jo Walsh
- Mark Surman
- Mayo Fuster Morell
- Nat Torkington
- Pieter Colpaert
- Hans Rosling
- John Naughton
- Nigel Shadbolt
- Panagiotis Bamidis
- Peter Suber
- Yasodara Cordova

== Network ==
As of 2018, Open Knowledge Foundation has 11 official chapters and 38 groups in different countries. In November 2022, the Open Knowledge Network was relaunched with two new projects.

It also supports 19 working groups.

- Lobbying Transparency
- Open Access
- Open Bibliography
- Open Definition
- Open Design & Hardware
- Open Development
- Open Economics
- Open Education
- OpenGLAM
- Open Government Data
- Open Humanities
- Open Linguistics
- Open Product Data
- Open Science
- OpenSpending
- Open Sustainability
- Open Transport (project)
- Personal Data and Privacy
- Public Domain

== Operations ==
Interview with Michael Bauer, Open Knowledge Foundation former employee at Centre de Cultura Contemporània de Barcelona

Many of Open Knowledge Foundation's projects are technical in nature. Its most prominent project, CKAN, is used by many of the world's governments to host open catalogues of data that their countries possess.

The organisation tends to support its aims by hosting infrastructure for semi-independent projects to develop. This approach to organising was hinted as one of its earliest projects was a project management service called KnowledgeForge, which runs on the KForge platform. KnowledgeForge allows sectoral working groups to have space to manage projects related to open knowledge. More widely, the project infrastructure includes both technical and face-to-face aspects. The organisation hosts several dozen mailing lists for virtual discussion, utilises IRC for real-time communications and also hosts events.

=== Advocacy ===
Open Knowledge Foundation is an active partner with organisations working in similar areas, such as open educational resources.

Open Knowledge Foundation has produced the Open Knowledge Definition, an attempt to clarify some of the ambiguity surrounding the terminology of openness, as well as the Open Software Service Definition. It also supported the development of the Open Database License (ODbL).

Outside of technology, Open Knowledge Foundation plays a role in advocating for openness broadly. This includes supporting the drafting of reports, facilitating consultation and producing guides.

Rufus Pollock, one of Open Knowledge Foundation's founders, and current board secretary sits on the UK government's Public Sector Transparency Board.

The Prototype Fund is a project of the Open Knowledge Foundation Germany, funded by the Federal Ministry of Education and Research (BMBF). It is a low-threshold funding program for Germany software developers who develop innovative open source software.

=== Technical ===
Banner for the Geodata project in Spanish

OpenGLAM logo

The foundation places a strong interest in the use of open source technologies. Its software projects are hosted on GitHub, which utilises the Git version control software. Some of the projects are listed below:

- CKAN, a tool that provides store for metadata. This enables governments to quickly and cheaply provide a catalogue of their data.
- Datahub, a community-run catalogue of useful sets of data on the Internet. Depending on the type of data (and its conditions of use), Datahub may also be able to store a copy of the data or host it in a database, and provide some basic visualisation tools.
- Frictionless Data, a collection of standards and tools for publishing data.
- Open bibliography, broadly construed as efforts to catalogue and build tools for working with and publishing bibliographic resources, with particular emphasis on those works that are in the public domain and public domain calculators. Examples include the Bibliographica, Public Domain Works, Open Shakespeare, Open Text Book and The Public Domain Review projects.
- OpenGLAM, an initiative that promotes free and open access to digital cultural heritage, held by GLAMs: Galleries, Libraries, Archives and Museums. OpenGLAM is co-funded by the European Commission as part of the DM2E (Digitised Manuscripts to Europeana) project.
- Open Economics
- Open Knowledge Forums
- Information Accessibility Initiative
- Open geodata
- Guide to open data licensing
- "Get the Data" — a web-site for questions and answer on how to get data sets.
- POD - Product Open Data

=== Events ===
Much of the collaboration with other related organisations occurs via events that the foundation hosts. Its premier event is the Open Knowledge Conference (OKCon), which has been held occasionally since 2007. Other events have been organised within the areas of data visualisation and free information network infrastructure.

Annually, Open Knowledge Foundation supports International Open Data Day.

=== Panton Principles and Fellowships (Open data in Science) ===
The Panton Principles (for Open Data in Science) in 2010 had large contributions from Open Knowledge people and in 2011 Jonathan Gray and Peter Murray-Rust successfully obtained funding from OSF for two fellowships, held by Sophie Kershaw and Ross Mounce. In 2013 OKF obtained sponsorship from CCIA for 3 fellowships, which were awarded to Rosemarie Graves, Sam Moore, and Peter Kraker.

=== Other ===
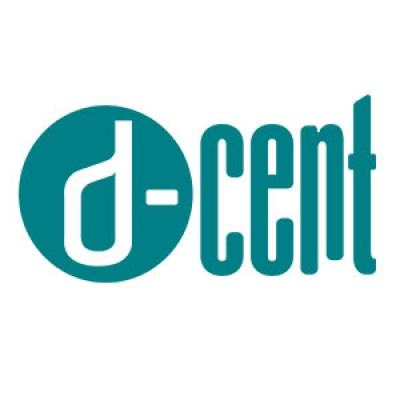
D-CENT logo

Open Knowledge Foundation also supports Apps for Europe, and D-CENT, a European project created to share and organise data from seven countries, which ran from October 2013 to May 2016.

== See also ==
- Access to Knowledge movement
- Free Knowledge Foundation
- Open Data Institute
- Open education
- Tactical Technology Collective
- Sovereign Tech Fund
