= Common Public Attribution License =

Software license

- Author: Socialtext
- Latest version: 1.0
- Publisher: Socialtext
- Published: July 2007
- SPDX identifier: CPAL-1.0
- Debian FSG compatible: No
- FSF approved: Yes
- OSI approved: Yes
- GPL compatible: No
- Copyleft: Limited
- Linking from code with a different license: Yes

The Common Public Attribution License ("CPAL") is a free software license approved by the Open Source Initiative in 2007. Its purpose is to be a general license for software distributed over a network. It is based on the Mozilla Public License, but it adds an attribution term paraphrased below:

[…] the Original Developer may include […] a requirement that each time an Executable and Source Code or a Larger Work is launched or initially run […] a prominent display of the Original Developer's Attribution Information […] must occur on the graphic user interface employed by the end user to access such Covered Code […]

The CPAL also adds the following section discussing "network use" which triggers copyleft provisions when running CPAL licensed code on a network service and this way closing the so-called ASP loophole:

The term “External Deployment” means the use, distribution, or communication of the Original Code or Modifications in any way such that the Original Code or Modifications may be used by anyone other than You, whether those works are distributed or communicated to those persons or made available as an application intended for use over a network. As an express condition for the grants of license hereunder, You must treat any External Deployment by You of the Original Code or Modifications as a distribution under section 3.1 and make Source Code available under Section 3.2.

The Debian project found the license to be incompatible with its Free Software Guidelines (DFSG) because of its attribution requirement.
