= IBM Public License =

Free software license

- Author: IBM
- Latest version: 1.0
- Publisher: IBM
- Published: August 1999; 26 years ago
- SPDX identifier: IPL-1.0
- Debian FSG compatible: Yes
- FSF approved: Yes
- OSI approved: Yes
- GPL compatible: No
- Copyleft: Yes
- Linking from code with a different license: Yes

The IBM Public License (IPL) is a free open-source software license written and occasionally used by IBM. It is approved by the Free Software Foundation (FSF) and described as an "open-source license" by the Open Source Initiative.

The IPL differs from the GNU General Public License (GPL), in that it places the liability on the publisher or distributor of the licensed software code. The reason behind this is to facilitate the commercial use of open-source software, without placing the contributor at risk of liability.

The IPL is incompatible with the GPL because it contains restrictions not included in the GPL, specifically a choice of law clause stating the license is to be interpreted under the laws of the State of New York and United States intellectual property law. According to the FSF, "This is a free software license. Unfortunately, it has a choice of law clause which makes it incompatible with the GNU GPL."

The IPL differs from the GPL in the handling of patents, as IPL terminates the license upon patent disputes.

Examples of software projects licensed under the IPL include Postfix, OpenAFS, and the now-unmaintained Jikes compiler for Java.

== See also ==
- IBM Common Public License
- GNU General Public License
- Mozilla Public License
- Software license
