= Sybase Open Watcom Public License =

Software license

- SPDX identifier: Watcom-1.0
- Debian FSG compatible: No
- FSF approved: No
- OSI approved: Yes
- GPL compatible: No
- Copyleft: Very strong

The Sybase Open Watcom Public License is a software license that has been approved by the Open Source Initiative. It is the licence under which the Open Watcom C/C++ compiler is released.

The license has not been accepted as "free" under the Debian Free Software Guidelines due to the license's restrictions on commercial use, the requirement to grant patent licenses not strictly related to the modified code itself, the requirement to continue to make the source code public for up to 12 months after deploying the modified code, and the termination clauses.

The Free Software Foundation (FSF) has stated that the license is not "free" as it requires the source to be published when you "deploy" the software for private use only. In contrast, FSF's GNU General Public License (GPL) does not require that modified source code be made public when the software modification was only used privately without a public release of the software. This makes the Watcom license also GPL incompatible. This makes it more restrictive than the GPL and even the AGPL.

The Fedora project also considers the license to be non-free.

== History ==
Version 1.0 appears to have been written in 2002. It's publicly released no later than January 8, 2003, the date of the initial release of Open Watcom C/C++.

The draft of version 2.0 of the License was published on 20 January 2004. This version incorporated changes from Apple and made the licence less specific to OpenWatcom.
