= Erlang Public License =

- Author: Ericsson
- Latest version: 1.1
- Publisher: Ericsson
- SPDX identifier: ErlPL-1.1
- FSF approved: No
- OSI approved: No
- Copyleft: Limited
- Website: www.erlang.org/EPLICENSE

The Erlang Public License is a computer software license, which was applied to some older Erlang programming language source code. It is a derivative work of the Mozilla Public License, containing terms which differ from MPL, mainly in terms of jurisdiction. The license was constructed in accordance with the laws of Sweden.

== Change of Apache License 2.0 ==
On June 12, 2015, Ericsson announced at the Erlang User Conference 2015 that starting with the subsequent major release, Erlang/OTP 18.0, Erlang/OTP source code would be released under terms of the Apache License 2.0.
