= Unlicense =

Anti-copyright license

- Unlicense logo
- Author: Arto Bendiken
- Published: 2010
- SPDX identifier: Unlicense
- FSF approved: Yes
- OSI approved: Yes
- GPL compatible: Yes
- Copyleft: No
- Linking from code with a different license: Yes
- Website: unlicense.org

The Unlicense is a public domain equivalent license for software which provides a public domain waiver with a fall-back public-domain-like license, similar to the CC Zero for cultural works. It includes language used in earlier software projects and has a focus on an anti-copyright message.

== License terms ==
The text of the Unlicense is as follows:

This is free and unencumbered software released into the public domain.

Anyone is free to copy, modify, publish, use, compile, sell, or
distribute this software, either in source code form or as a compiled
binary, for any purpose, commercial or non-commercial, and by any
means.

In jurisdictions that recognize copyright laws, the author or authors
of this software dedicate any and all copyright interest in the
software to the public domain. We make this dedication for the benefit
of the public at large and to the detriment of our heirs and
successors. We intend this dedication to be an overt act of
relinquishment in perpetuity of all present and future rights to this
software under copyright law.

THE SOFTWARE IS PROVIDED "AS IS", WITHOUT WARRANTY OF ANY KIND,
EXPRESS OR IMPLIED, INCLUDING BUT NOT LIMITED TO THE WARRANTIES OF
MERCHANTABILITY, FITNESS FOR A PARTICULAR PURPOSE AND NONINFRINGEMENT.
IN NO EVENT SHALL THE AUTHORS BE LIABLE FOR ANY CLAIM, DAMAGES OR
OTHER LIABILITY, WHETHER IN AN ACTION OF CONTRACT, TORT OR OTHERWISE,
ARISING FROM, OUT OF OR IN CONNECTION WITH THE SOFTWARE OR THE USE OR
OTHER DEALINGS IN THE SOFTWARE.

For more information, please refer to <https://unlicense.org>

== Reception ==
The Free Software Foundation states that "Both public domain works and the lax license provided by the Unlicense are compatible with the GNU GPL."

Google does not allow its employees to contribute to projects under public domain equivalent licenses like the Unlicense (and CC0), while allowing contributions to 0BSD licensed and US government PD projects.

Notable projects that use the Unlicense include youtube-dl, Second Reality, and the source code of the 1995 video game Gloom.

== History ==
In a post published on January 1 (Public Domain Day), 2010, Arto Bendiken, the author of the Unlicense, outlined his reasons for preferring public domain software, namely: the nuisance of dealing with licensing terms (for instance license incompatibility), the threat inherent in copyright law, and the impracticability of copyright law.

On January 23, 2010, Bendiken followed-up on his initial post. In this post, he explained that the Unlicense is based on the copyright waiver of SQLite with the no-warranty statement from the MIT License. He then walked through the license, commenting on each part.

In a post published in December 2010, Bendiken further clarified what it means to "license" and "unlicense" software.

In December 2010, Mike Linksvayer, the vice president of Creative Commons at the time, wrote in an identi.ca conversation "I like the movement" in speaking of the Unlicense effort, considering it compatible with the goals of the CC Zero (CC0) license, released in 2009. On January 1, 2011, Bendiken reviewed the progress and adoption of the Unlicense, saying it was "difficult to give estimates of current Unlicense adoption" but there were "many hundreds of projects using the Unlicense".

In January 2012, when discussed on OSI's license-review mailing list, the Unlicense was brushed off as a crayon license. In particular, it was criticized for being possibly inconsistent and non-standard, and for making it difficult for some projects to accept Unlicensed code as third-party contributions; leaving too much room for interpretation; and possibly being incoherent in some legal systems. A request for legacy approval was filed in March 2020, which led to a formal approval in June 2020, with an acknowledgement of a "general agreement that the document is poorly drafted".

In 2015, GitHub reported that approximately 102,000 of their 5.1 million licensed projects (2% of licensed projects on GitHub.com) used the Unlicense.

Until 2022, the Fedora Project recommended CC0 over the Unlicense because the former is "a more comprehensive legal text". However, in July 2022, the CC0 license became unsupported and software to be released in the Fedora distribution must not be under CC0, due to CC0 not waiving patent rights.

== See also ==
- 0BSD a public domain equivalent license used by Toybox and explicitly allowed for Android
- WTFPL
- Comparison of free and open-source software licenses
