= Eiffel Forum License =

- Author: NICE
- Latest version: 2
- Publisher: NICE
- Published: 2002
- SPDX identifier: EFL-1.0, EFL-2.0
- Debian FSG compatible: Yes
- FSF approved: Yes
- OSI approved: Yes
- GPL compatible: Yes
- Copyleft: No
- Linking from code with a different license: Yes

The Eiffel Forum License (EFL) is a free software license written by NICE, the Non-Profit International Consortium for Eiffel. Version 2 of the license, the latest as of 2008, is the first version to be GPL compatible. EFLv2 has been approved by the OSI, and is approved as a free software license by the FSF.

The Eiffel Forum License is one of the shortest licenses that is OSI approved.

== License text ==
 Eiffel Forum License, version 2
 
 1. Permission is hereby granted to use, copy, modify and/or
    distribute this package, provided that:
       * copyright notices are retained unchanged,
       * any distribution of this package, whether modified or not,
         includes this license text.
 2. Permission is hereby also granted to distribute binary programs
    which depend on this package. If the binary program depends on a
    modified version of this package, you are encouraged to publicly
    release the modified version of this package.
 
 THIS PACKAGE IS PROVIDED "AS IS" AND WITHOUT WARRANTY. ANY EXPRESS OR
 IMPLIED WARRANTIES, INCLUDING, BUT NOT LIMITED TO, THE IMPLIED
 WARRANTIES OF MERCHANTABILITY AND FITNESS FOR A PARTICULAR PURPOSE ARE
 DISCLAIMED. IN NO EVENT SHALL THE AUTHORS BE LIABLE TO ANY PARTY FOR ANY
 DIRECT, INDIRECT, INCIDENTAL, SPECIAL, EXEMPLARY, OR CONSEQUENTIAL
 DAMAGES ARISING IN ANY WAY OUT OF THE USE OF THIS PACKAGE.

== Example application ==
Since this is a published licence it may be referenced from a work using the following simple statement:

Copyright 2008, Author Name, example.org
Licensed under the Eiffel Forum License 2.
