= AROS Public License =

- Published: 1995
- Debian FSG compatible: "Likely problems" according to debian-legal
- FSF approved: No
- OSI approved: No
- GPL compatible: No, unless a GPL-compatible license is also offered as an alternative license
- Copyleft: Limited
- Linking from code with a different license: Yes

The AROS Public License (APL) is a software license which is primarily used as the license for the AROS Research Operating System software project. Version 1.1 is based on the text of Mozilla Public License 1.1, with some definitions added and Netscape-specific texts changed.

It has not been officially approved as a free or open source license by the FSF, OSI, or Debian. The license the APL is based on, MPL v1.1, is incompatible with the GPL, unless the developer offers the choice of licensing the program under the GPL or any other GPL-compatible license.
