= Netscape Public License =

Free software license

- Author: Netscape
- Latest version: 1.1
- Publisher: Netscape
- Published: ?
- Debian FSG compatible: ?
- FSF approved: Yes
- OSI approved: No
- GPL compatible: No
- Copyleft: Limited
- Linking from code with a different license: Yes

The Netscape Public License (NPL) is a free software license, the license under which Netscape Communications Corporation originally released Mozilla.

Its most notable feature is that it gives the original developer of Mozilla (Netscape, now a subsidiary of AOL), the right to distribute modifications made by other contributors under whatever terms it desires, including proprietary terms, without granting similar rights to these other contributors in respect to contributions made by the original developer. This allowed the release of the Netscape 6 and later versions as proprietary software.

This asymmetry with respect to rights has led to criticism of the license by many members of the open source and free software movements: the Free Software Foundation acknowledged it as a free-software license but one to be avoided, and the Open Source Initiative either rejected it entirely or was not asked to review it. The FSF adds that it's not possible to combine software obtained under the license with software obtained under the GPL.

The Mozilla Public License version 1.1 is similar (and has limited "file-level copyleft"), but lacks the asymmetry in rights. Time Warner, exercising its rights under the Netscape Public License, and at the request of the Mozilla Foundation, relicensed all code in Mozilla that was under the Netscape Public License (including code by other contributors) to an MPL 1.1/GPL 2.0/LGPL 2.1 tri-license, thus removing the GPL-incompatibility.
