= Intel Open Source License =

Software license by Intel

- Author: Intel Corporation
- Publisher: Intel Corporation
- SPDX identifier: Intel
- FSF approved: Yes
- OSI approved: Yes
- GPL compatible: Yes
- Copyleft: No
- Linking from code with a different license: Yes

The Intel Open Source license is identical to the BSD license with the following section added:

EXPORT LAWS: THIS LICENSE ADDS NO RESTRICTIONS TO THE EXPORT LAWS OF YOUR JURISDICTION. It is licensee's responsibility to comply with any export regulations applicable in licensee's jurisdiction. Under CURRENT (May 2000) U.S. export regulations this software is eligible for export from the U.S. and can be downloaded by or otherwise exported or reexported worldwide EXCEPT to U.S. embargoed destinations which include Cuba, Iraq, Libya, North Korea, Iran, Syria, Sudan, Afghanistan and any other country to which the U.S. has embargoed goods and services.

The extra section does not add to the terms of the license, rather it reminds users of U.S. export laws. As such the IOSL is functionally identical to the BSD license, and so is GPL compatible (i.e., software distributed under the IOSL can be relicensed as GPL, and so can be included in GPL software).

Intel has voluntarily retracted the license from the OSI list of open source licenses to prevent license proliferation and ceased to use or recommend this license.

== See also ==
- GNU General Public License (GPL)
- BSD license
- List of software licenses
