= Sun Public License =

- Author: Sun Microsystems
- SPDX identifier: SPL-1.0
- FSF approved: Yes
- OSI approved: Yes
- GPL compatible: No

The Sun Public License (SPL) is a software license that applies to some open-source software released by Sun Microsystems (such as NetBeans before the 5.5 version). It has been approved by the Free Software Foundation (FSF) as a free software license, and by the Open Source Initiative (OSI) as an open source license. It is derived from the Mozilla Public License.

This license has been superseded by the Common Development and Distribution License, which is also derived from the MPL.
