= Reciprocal Public License =

- Author: Scott Shattuck
- Latest version: 1.5
- Published: 2001
- SPDX identifier: RPL-1.1, RPL-1.5
- Debian FSG compatible: No
- FSF approved: No
- OSI approved: Yes
- GPL compatible: No
- Copyleft: No

The Reciprocal Public License (RPL) is a software license released in 2001. Version 1.5 of the license was published on July 15, 2007, and was approved by the Open Source Initiative as an open-source license.

== Description ==
The RPL was authored in 2001 by Scott Shattuck, a software architect for Technical Pursuit Inc. for use with that company's TIBET product line.

The RPL was inspired by the GNU General Public License (GPL) and authored to explicitly remove what the RPL's authors have referred to as the GPL's "privacy loophole". The GPL privacy loopholes allows recipients of GPL'd code to:

1. make changes to source code which are never released to the open source community (by virtue of not deploying "to a third party"), and
2. derive financial or other business benefit from that action, violating what some might consider a simple concept of "fairness".

Because of its "viral" nature, the RPL is often found in dual-licensing models in which it is paired with more traditional closed-source licenses. This strategy allows software companies who use this model to present customers with a "pay with cash or pay with code" option, ensuring either the growth of the software directly through code contributions or indirectly through cash which can be used to fund further development.

== Reception ==
The RPL was written to conform to the requirements of the Open Source Initiative to ensure that it met the goals for an Open Source license and is an approved open-source license. However, because of its requirements for reciprocation without exceptions, it is considered to be non-free by the Free Software Foundation. The license is used by Active Agenda, a risk-management web application, and NServiceBus, an asynchronous messaging library for the .NET/Mono platform. The RPL and GPL are used by OPC Foundation under the dual-licence scheme, where the former is used for members and the latter for non-members.
