= Yahoo Public License =

- SPDX identifier: YPL-1.0, YPL-1.1
- FSF approved: Yes
- GPL compatible: No

Yahoo! Public License is a free software license by Yahoo!. It is used among others by old versions of the collaborative software Zimbra. It is approved by the Free Software Foundation as a free (however GPL-incompatible) software license.
