= Sluc =

Sluc may refer to:

- SLUC, a Spanish software license
- SLUC Nancy, a French basketball team
- Sluč, a Belarusian river
