= SLUC =

Software Libre para Uso Civil
- Author: Babel Informática SL
- Latest version: n/a
- Publisher: ?
- Published: December 2006
- Debian FSG compatible: ?
- FSF approved: No
- OSI approved: No
- GPL compatible: No
- Copyleft: Yes
- Linking from code with a different license: No

SLUC is a Spanish acronym for Software Libre para Uso Civil ("Free Software for Civil Use").

This is a software license published in Spain in December 2006 to allow all but military use of this kind of software.

The writers of the license maintain it is free software, but the Free Software Foundation says it is not free because it infringes the so-called "zero freedom" of the GPL, that is, the freedom to use the software for any purpose.

The SLUC license avoids military use by prohibiting the use of the software to military personnel and to personnel in industries creating offensive weapons.

On the other hand, the SLUC license permits any other use of the software. It permits free copying, modification, and redistribution with the same freedom. This guarantees access to source code and adds some technical clauses to avoid software patents and any responsibility of the authors for the software's behavior or usability for any purpose.

The authors manifest the "Freedom of Conscience" of developers as the origin of the license.

== See also ==
- Free software license
- The Free Software Definition
