= Cryptix General License =

Software license

The Cryptix General License is in use by the Cryptix project, well known for their Java Cryptography Extension. It is a modified version of the BSD license, with similarly liberal terms. The Free Software Foundation states that it is a permissive free software license compatible with the GNU General Public License.
