= Gang Garrison 2 =

2008 video game

- Developer: Faucet Software
- Release: 2008; 18 years ago
- Stable release: v2.9.2 / 1 April 2019; 7 years ago
- Written in: Game Maker 8
- Platform: Microsoft Windows
- Type: Action, shooter
- License: MPL 2.0
- Website: www.ganggarrison.com
- Repository: https://github.com/Gang-Garrison-2/Gang-Garrison-2/

Gang Garrison 2 is an open-source indie video game "demake" of Valve's Team Fortress 2. Inspired by the 3D graphics of Team Fortress 2, it takes place in a 2D, 8-bit environment, while retaining its online multiplayer gameplay. The game was started by TIGSource users "mrfredman" and "MedO", with other users contributing to development. It was conceived as an entry into the 2008 TIGSource "Bootleg Demake" competition.

== Gameplay ==
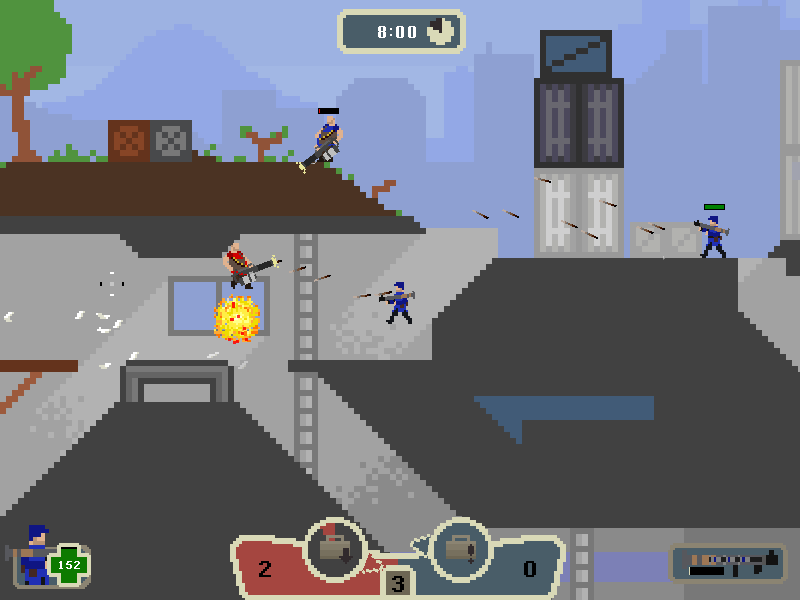
Gameplay of Gang Garrison 2 (v2.6.3)

Gang Garrison 2 uses the major gameplay tenets of Team Fortress 2, while modifying them for use in 2D. The player can choose one of nine different classes, each with their own strengths and weaknesses. One is hidden and can be accessed by pressing 'Q' at the class select screen. Each class had their name changed, and lack abilities as specialized as Team Fortress 2 due to technical constraints. The classes are: Runner (Scout), Detonator (Demoman), Rocketman (Soldier), Firebug (Pyro), Constructor (Engineer), Rifleman (Sniper), Healer (Medic), Overweight (Heavy), and Infiltrator (Spy). Additionally, the main characters from Cave Story make guest appearances as the hidden 10th class. Each character only possesses one special ability and one weapon; for example, the Rifleman's rifle and the Infiltrator's revolver.

There are currently five game modes, with a sixth in development. Capture the flag, which involves capturing a briefcase filled with intelligence, Control Point, where the teams fight for control of specific locations, Generator mode, where each team tries to destroy the opposing team's power generator, Arena, where players try to get rid of the other team's players, King of the Hill, where a single control point needs to be captured and defended for a set time, and Double King of the Hill where two control points are present, but both need to be captured in order for the clock to start. "Critical" shots, special attacks which cause extra damage in Team Fortress 2, have been removed in Gang Garrison 2. Games are played on online gameservers, which the player can find with help of a lobby server or join manually. Servers can also be hosted by players.

Since version 2.5, Gang Garrison 2 has had a "server-sent plugins" system, in which game plugins (which, for example, add voting on the next map or in-game text chat) can be automatically downloaded when joining a server.

== Development ==
Development of Gang Garrison 2 began as an entry into the 2008 TIGSource.com "Bootleg Demake" competition by mrfredman (art), MedO (programming) and Synnah (music). While it did not win the competition, it later grew in popularity on the site's forum. Initially the game lacked several features and balancing, especially class abilities for the Constructor and the Infiltrator, which caused other developers to decompile the code and update the game without consent. The original development team reacted by merging the unofficial changes and releasing the game under an open source license to allow contribution to the official version and avoid further forks. Version 2.0 was released on February 10, 2009. This version included taunts, new music, maps, and options, various graphical improvements, a spectator mode, autobalance, kill notification, and in-game communication. Version 2.1 was released on May 3, 2009. This version included Control Points, new music, maps, various graphical updates, Demoman "sticky counter", sentry hud, and "superburst", a medic ability very similar to Team Fortress 2's "Ubercharge", and various other smaller tweaks. Last update was released on 1 April 2019.

As of 2019, the game continues to be developed as an open source project, with the source code hosted on GitHub. The game is licensed under the Mozilla Public License. The game was originally licensed as GPLv3, but was relicensed in 2014 due to license incompatibilities.

== Reception ==
Gang Garrison 2 received positive reviews from critics. Darren Gladstone of PC World noted that the game "translates surprisingly well to 2D." Tyler Nagata of Games Radar commented that it "is guaranteed to make you grin when you hear its cover of the TF2 theme song with MIDI-fied bleeps and bloops ... and ... when you start scrolling through the game’s super pixilated takes on TF2 classes." Scott Sharkey of 1UP wrote that the game "was pretty much at the top of the heap [of demakes]," also stating the possibility that he might "prefer this thing to Team Fortress 2" and that it was "a great way to blow a few minutes while putting off work."

Eric Smith of the Team Fortress 2 development team expressed support for the game, announcing version 2.1 on the official TF2 blog.

== See also ==
- List of open source games
