= Common Public License =

Free-software license

- Author: IBM
- Latest version: 1.0
- Publisher: IBM
- Published: May 2001; 25 years ago
- SPDX identifier: CPL-1.0
- Debian FSG compatible: Yes
- FSF approved: Yes
- OSI approved: Yes
- GPL compatible: No
- Copyleft: Limited
- Linking from code with a different license: Yes

In computing, the Common Public License (CPL) is a free software / open-source software license published by IBM. The Free Software Foundation and Open Source Initiative have approved the license terms of the CPL.

== Definition ==
The CPL has the stated aims of supporting and encouraging collaborative open-source development while still retaining the ability to use the CPL'd content with software licensed under other licenses, including many proprietary licenses. The Eclipse Public License (EPL) consists of a slightly modified version of the CPL.

The CPL has some terms that resemble those of the GNU General Public License (GPL), but some key differences exist. A similarity relates to distribution of a modified computer program: under either license (CPL or GPL), one must make the source code of a modified program available to others.

CPL, like the GNU Lesser General Public License, allows non-CPL-licensed software to link to a library under CPL without requiring the linked source code to be made available to the licensee.

CPL lacks compatibility with both versions of the GPL because it has a "choice of law" section in section 7, which restricts legal disputes to a certain court. Another source of incompatibility is the differing copyleft requirements.

To reduce the number of open source licenses, IBM and Eclipse Foundation agreed upon using solely the Eclipse Public License in the future. Open Source Initiative therefore lists the Common Public License as deprecated and superseded by EPL.

== Projects using the Common Public License ==
- Microsoft has released its Windows Installer XML (WiX) developer tool, Windows Template Library (WTL) and the FlexWiki engine under the CPL as SourceForge projects.
- Some projects of the COIN-OR Foundation use the CPL.

== See also ==
- Software license
- Software using the Common Public License (category)
