= YPL =

YPL may refer to:

- Pickle Lake Airport
- Yunnan Provincial Library
- Yahoo! Public License
