= GNU Affero General Public License =

Strong copyleft free software license

- Author: Free Software Foundation
- Latest version: 3
- Publisher: Free Software Foundation, Inc.
- Published: November 19, 2007
- SPDX identifier: AGPL-3.0-or-later; AGPL-3.0-only
- Debian FSG compatible: Yes
- FSF approved: Yes
- OSI approved: Yes
- GPL compatible: Yes (permits linking with GPLv3)
- Copyleft: Yes, incl. use over network
- Linking from code with a different license: Only with GPLv3; AGPL terms will apply for the AGPL part in a combined work.
- Website: www.gnu.org/licenses/agpl.html

The GNU Affero General Public License (GNU AGPL) is a free copyleft license published by the Free Software Foundation in November 2007, based on the GNU GPL version 3 and the Affero General Public License (non-GNU).

It is intended for software designed to be run over a network, adding a provision requiring that the corresponding source code of modified versions of the software be prominently offered to all users who interact with the software over a network.

The Open Source Initiative approved the GNU AGPLv3 as an open-source license in March 2008 after the company Funambol submitted it for consideration through its CEO Fabrizio Capobianco.

== History ==
In 2000, while developing an e-learning and e-service business model at Mandriva, Henry Poole met with Richard Stallman in Amsterdam and discussed the issue of the GPLv2 license not requiring Web application providers to share source code with the users interacting with their software over a network. Over the following months, Stallman and Poole discussed approaches to solve the problem. In 2001, Poole founded Affero Inc. (a web services business), and he needed a license that would require distribution by other organizations who used Affero code to create derivative web services. At that time, Poole contacted Bradley M. Kuhn and Eben Moglen of the Free Software Foundation to get advice on a new license that would resolve this matter in GPLv2.

Around late February 2002, Kuhn suggested, based on the idea of a quine (a program that prints its own source code), that GPLv2 be supplemented with a section 2(d) that would require derivative works to maintain a "download source" feature that would provide complete and corresponding source code. Kuhn argued that there was precedent for such a requirement in GPLv2 section 2(c), which required preserving certain features by downstream distributors and modifiers.

Moglen and Kuhn wrote the text of the proposed new section 2(d), and provided it to Poole, who then requested and received permission from the FSF to publish a derivative of GPLv2 for this purpose. In March 2002, Affero, Inc. published the original Affero General Public License (AGPLv1) for use with the Affero project and made the new license available for use by other software-as-a-service developers.

The FSF contemplated including the special provision of AGPLv1 into GPLv3 but ultimately decided to publish a separate license, nearly identical to GPLv3 but containing a provision similar in purpose and effect to section 2(d) of AGPLv1. The new license was named the GNU Affero General Public License. Retaining the Affero name indicated its close historic relationship with AGPLv1. The GNU AGPL was given version number 3 for parity with the GPL, and the current GNU Affero General Public License is often abbreviated AGPLv3.

The finalized version of GNU AGPLv3 was published by the FSF on November 19, 2007.

== Compatibility with the GPL ==
Both versions of the AGPL, like the corresponding versions of the GNU GPL on which they are based, are strong copyleft licenses. In the Free Software Foundation's judgment, the added requirement in section 2(d) of Affero GPL v1 made it incompatible with the otherwise nearly identical GPLv2. That is to say, one cannot distribute a single work formed by combining components covered by each license.

By contrast, the GPLv3 and GNU AGPLv3 licenses include clauses (in section 13 of each license) that together achieve a form of mutual compatibility for the two licenses. These clauses explicitly allow the "conveying" of a work formed by linking code licensed under the one license against code licensed under the other license, despite the licenses otherwise not allowing relicensing under the terms of each other. In this way, the copyleft of each license is relaxed to allow distributing such combinations.

To establish an upgrade path from Affero's original AGPLv1 to the GNU AGPLv3, Affero, Inc. published the Affero General Public License version 2 in November 2007, which is merely a transitional license that allows recipients of software licensed under "AGPLv1 or any later version as published by Affero, Inc." to distribute the software, or derivative works, under the GNU AGPLv3 or any later version.

== Examples of applications under GNU AGPL ==
stet was the first software system known to be released under the GNU AGPL, on November 21, 2007, and is the only known program to be used mainly for the production of its own license.

Flask developer Armin Ronacher noted in 2013 that the GNU AGPL is a "terrible success, especially among the startup community" as a "vehicle for dual commercial licensing", and gave HumHub, MongoDB (that later relicensed, see below), Odoo (that later switched to the LGPL), RethinkDB (that later relicensed to permissive license), Shinken, Slic3r, SugarCRM, and WURFL as examples.

MongoDB dropped the AGPL in late-2018 in favor of the "Server Side Public License" (SSPL), a modified version which requires those who offer the licensed software as a service accessible to third-parties, to make the entire source code of all software used to facilitate the service (including without limitation all "management software, user interfaces, application program interfaces, automation software, monitoring software, backup software, storage software and hosting software, all such that a user could run an instance of the service using the Service Source Code you make available") available under the same license. As approval for the SSPL by the Open Source Initiative was not forthcoming, the application for certification was withdrawn. It was banned by both Debian and the Fedora Project, who state that the license's intent is to discriminate against cloud computing providers offering services based on the software without purchasing its commercial license.

Software continues to be released under AGPLv3, various examples include many servers and clients for the fediverse such as Mastodon, Pixelfed and PeerTube, office suite software OnlyOffice, the RStudio IDE for the R programming language, system monitoring platform Grafana, the document/bibliography management system Zotero and more.

Decentralized chat and collaboration software Element was relicensed from Apache 2.0 to both AGPLv3 and GPLv3, with a separate proprietary license for Element Commercial.

== See also ==
- List of software under the GNU AGPL
- Free-software license
- GNU General Public License
- GNU Lesser General Public License
- GNAT Modified General Public License
- GPL linking exception
- GNU Free Documentation License
- Comparison of free and open-source software licenses
