= Simon Phipps (programmer) =

Computer scientist and web and open source advocate

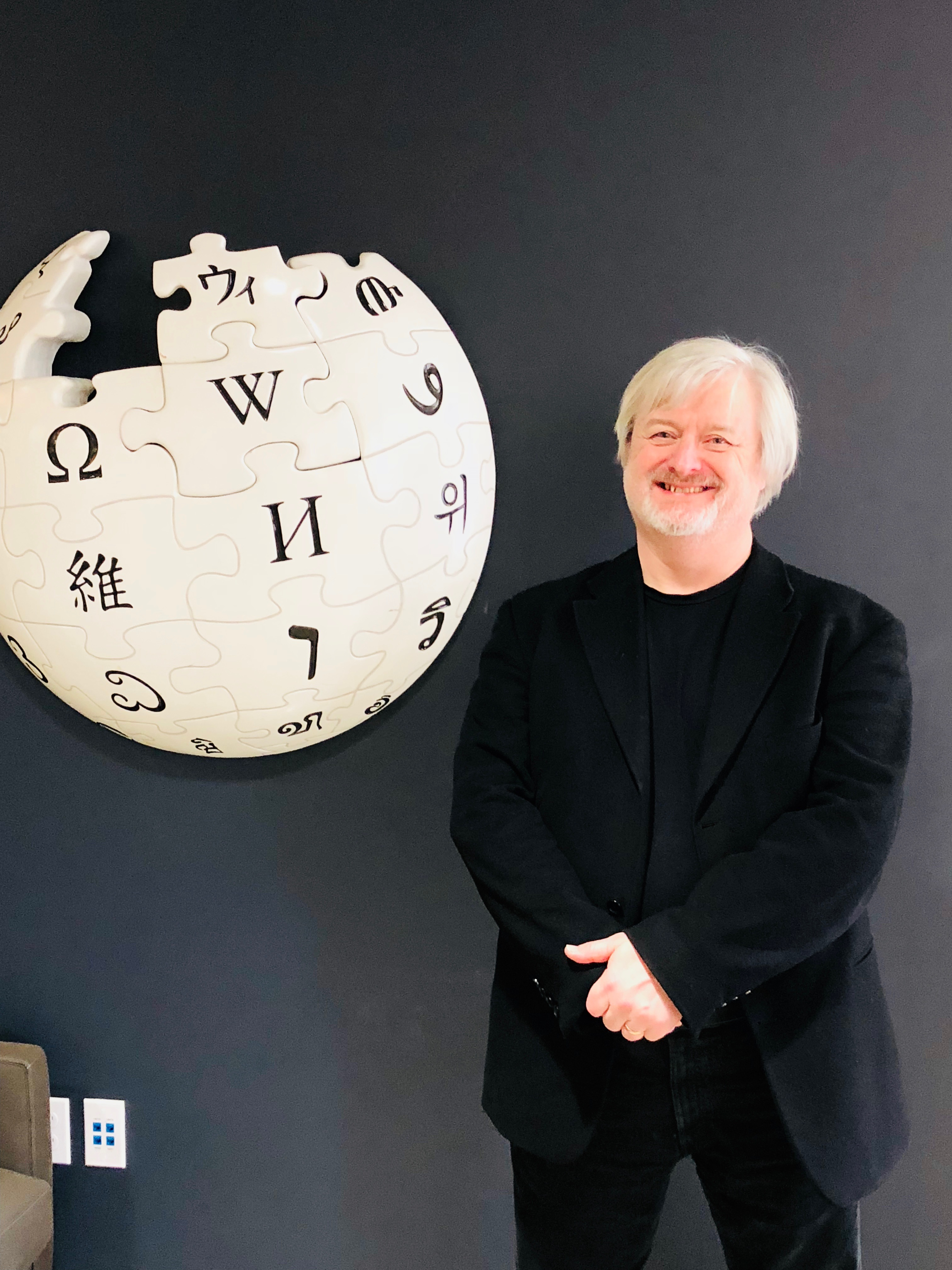
Simon Phipps at the Wikimedia Foundation office in April 2018

Simon Phipps is a computer scientist and web and open source advocate.

Phipps was instrumental in IBM's involvement in the Java programming language, founding IBM's Java Technology Center. He left IBM for Sun Microsystems in 2000, taking leadership of Sun's open source programme from Danese Cooper. Under Phipps, most of Sun's core software was released under open source licenses, including Solaris and Java.

Phipps was not hired into Oracle as part of the acquisition of Sun Microsystems and his final day was March 8, 2010 when the two entities combined. Following Sun, he spent a year as Chief Strategy Officer of identity startup ForgeRock before becoming an independent consultant. In 2015 he briefly joined Wipro Technologies as director of their open source advisory practice.

Phipps was President of the Open Source Initiative until 2015 when he stepped down in preparation for the end of his Board term in 2016, and was re-elected in 2017 and re-appointed President by the Board in September 2017. He was a board member of the Open Rights Group and The Document Foundation and on the advisory board of Open Source for America. He has served on a number of advisory boards for other projects, including as CEO of the MariaDB Foundation, and at the GNOME Foundation, OpenSolaris, OpenJDK, and OpenSPARC and most recently the AlmaLinux OS Foundation.

He has appeared as a guest and occasional co-host on episodes of the FLOSS Weekly podcast.
