= Comparison of free and open-source software licenses =

This comparison covers notable software licenses which are approved by at least one of the following expert groups: the Free Software Foundation, the Open Source Initiative, the Debian Project, or the Fedora Project.

== FOSS licenses ==
FOSS stands for "Free and Open Source Software". There is no one universally agreed-upon definition of FOSS software and various groups maintain approved lists of licenses. The Open Source Initiative (OSI) is one such organization keeping a list of open-source licenses. The Free Software Foundation (FSF) maintains a list of what it considers free. FSF's free software and OSI's open-source licenses together are called FOSS licenses. There are licenses accepted by the OSI which are not free as per the Free Software Definition. The Open Source Definition allows for further restrictions like price, type of contribution and origin of the contribution, e.g. the case of the NASA Open Source Agreement, which requires the code to be "original" work. The OSI does not endorse FSF license analysis (interpretation) as per their disclaimer.

The FSF's Free Software Definition focuses on the user's unrestricted rights to use a program, to study and modify it, to copy it, and to redistribute it for any purpose, which are considered by the FSF the four essential freedoms. The OSI's open-source criteria focuses on the availability of the source code and the advantages of an unrestricted and community driven development model. Yet, many FOSS licenses, like the Apache License, and all Free Software licenses allow commercial use of FOSS components.

== General comparison ==
For a simpler comparison across the most common licenses see free-software license comparison.

The following table compares various features of each license and is a general guide to the terms and conditions of each license, based on seven subjects or categories. Recent tools like the European Commissions' Licensing Assistant, makes possible the licenses selection and comparison based on more than 40 subjects or categories, with access to their SPDX identifier and full text. The table below lists the permissions and limitations regarding the following subjects:

- Linking - linking of the licensed code with code licensed under a different license (e.g. when the code is provided as a library)
- Distribution - distribution of the code to third parties
- Modification - modification of the code by a licensee
- Patent grant - protection of licensees from patent claims made by code contributors regarding their contribution, and protection of contributors from patent claims made by licensees
- Private use - whether modification to the code must be shared with the community or may be used privately (e.g. internal use by a corporation)
- Sublicensing - whether modified code may be licensed under a different license (for example a copyright) or must retain the same license under which it was provided
- TM grant - use of trademarks associated with the licensed code or its contributors by a licensee

In this table, "permissive" means the software has minimal restrictions on how it can be used, modified, and redistributed, usually including a warranty disclaimer. "Copyleft" means the software requires that its source code be made available to each user and that all provisions in the license be preserved in derivative works.

License	Author	Latest version	Publication date	Linking	Distribution	Modification	Patent grant	Private use	Sublicensing	TM grant
Academic Free License	Lawrence E. Rosen	3.0	2002	Permissive	Permissive	Permissive	Yes	Yes	Permissive	No
Affero General Public License	Affero Inc	3.0	2007	Copylefted	Copyleft except for the GNU AGPL	Copyleft	?	Yes	?	?
Apache License	Apache Software Foundation	2.0	2004	Permissive	Permissive	Permissive	Yes	Yes	Permissive	No
Apple Public Source License	Apple Computer	2.0	August 6, 2003	Permissive	?	Limited	?	?	?	?
Artistic License	Larry Wall	2.0	2000	With restrictions	With restrictions	With restrictions	No	Permissive	With restrictions	No
Beerware	Poul-Henning Kamp	42	1998 (Note: See footnote of the Beerware article)	Permissive	Permissive	Permissive	No	Permissive	Permissive	No
BSD License	Regents of the University of California	—N/a	?	Permissive	Permissive	Permissive	Manually	Yes	No	Manually
Boost Software License	Devin Smith	1.0	August 17, 2003	Permissive	Permissive	Permissive	No	Permissive	With restrictions	No
Creative Commons Zero	Creative Commons	1.0	2009	Public Domain	Public Domain	Public Domain	No	Public Domain	No	No
CC BY	Creative Commons	4.0	2002	Permissive	Permissive	Permissive	No	Yes	No	No
CC BY-SA	Creative Commons	4.0	2002	Copylefted	Copylefted	Copylefted	No	Yes	No	No
CeCILL	CEA / CNRS / INRIA	2.1	June 21, 2013	Permissive	Permissive	Permissive	No	Permissive	With restrictions	No
Common Development and Distribution License	Sun Microsystems	1.0	December 1, 2004	Permissive	?	Limited	?	?	?	?
Common Public License	IBM	1.0	May 2001	Permissive	?	Copylefted	?	?	?	?
Cryptix General License	Cryptix Foundation	—N/a	1995	Permissive	Permissive	Permissive	Manually	Yes	?	Manually
Eclipse Public License	Eclipse Foundation	2.0	August 24, 2017	Permissive	Copylefted	Copylefted	Yes	Yes	Copylefted	No
Educational Community License	Indiana University	1.0	2007	Permissive	?	Permissive	?	?	?	?
European Union Public Licence	European Commission	1.2	May 2017	Permissive, according to EU law (Recitals 10 & 15 Directive 2009/24/EC)	Copylefted, with an explicit compatibility list	Copylefted, with an explicit compatibility list	Yes	yes, but network usage (communication to the public) is considered as a "distribution"	Copylefted, with an explicit compatibility list	No
FreeBSD	The FreeBSD project	—N/a	April 1999	Permissive	Permissive	Permissive	Manually	Permissive	No	Manually
GLWTS License	Anonymous	1.0	2025	Permissive	Permissive	Permissive	Yes	Yes	Permissive	Yes
GNU Affero General Public License	Free Software Foundation	3.0	2007	GNU GPLv3 only	Copylefted	Copylefted	Yes	Network usage is not considered private use	Copylefted	Yes
GNU General Public License	Free Software Foundation	3.0	June 2007	GPLv3 compatible only	Copylefted	Copylefted	Yes	Yes	Copylefted	Yes
GNU Lesser General Public License	Free Software Foundation	3.0	June 2007	With restrictions	Copylefted	Copylefted	Yes	Yes	Copylefted	Yes
IBM Public License	IBM	1.0	August 1999	Copylefted	?	Copylefted	?	?	?	?
ISC license	Internet Systems Consortium	—N/a	June 2003	Permissive	Permissive	Permissive	Manually	Permissive	Permissive	Manually
LaTeX Project Public License	LaTeX project	1.3c	?	Permissive	?	Permissive	?	?	?	?
Microsoft Public License	Microsoft	—N/a	?	Copylefted	Copylefted	Copylefted	No	Permissive	?	No
MIT license / X11 license	MIT	—N/a	1988	Permissive	Permissive	Permissive	Manually	Yes	Permissive	Manually
Mozilla Public License	Mozilla Foundation	2.0	January 3, 2012	Permissive	Copylefted	Copylefted	Yes	Yes	Copylefted	No
Netscape Public License	Netscape	1.1	?	Limited	?	Limited	?	?	?	?
Open Software License	Lawrence Rosen	3.0	2005	Permissive	Copylefted	Copylefted	Yes	Yes	Copylefted	?
OpenSSL license	OpenSSL Project	—N/a	?	Permissive	?	Permissive	?	?	?	?
PHP License	PHP Group	3.01	2019	With restrictions	With restrictions	With restrictions	Yes	Yes	With restrictions	Manually
Python Software Foundation License	Python Software Foundation	3.9.1	May 10, 2020	Permissive	Permissive	Permissive	Yes	Permissive	Permissive	No
Q Public License	Trolltech	?	?	Limited	?	Limited	?	?	?	?
Ruby License	Yukihiro Matsumoto	2.0	1995	Permissive	Permissive	Permissive	Yes	Permissive	Permissive	No
Sleepycat License	Sleepycat Software	—N/a	1996	Permissive	With restrictions	Permissive	No	Yes	No	No
Unlicense	unlicense.org	1	December 2010	Permissive/Public domain	Permissive/Public domain	Permissive/Public domain	?	Permissive/Public domain	Permissive/Public domain	?
W3C Software Notice and License	W3C	20021231	December 31, 2002	Permissive	?	Permissive	?	?	?	?
Do What The Fuck You Want To Public License (WTFPL)	Banlu Kemiyatorn, Sam Hocevar	2	December 2004	Permissive/Public domain	Permissive/Public domain	Permissive/Public domain	Implied	Yes	Yes	Implied
XCore Open Source License also separate "Hardware License Agreement"	XMOS	?	February 2011	Permissive	Permissive	Permissive	Manually	Yes	Permissive	?
XFree86 1.1 License	The XFree86 Project, Inc	?	?	Permissive	?	Permissive	?	?	?	?
zlib/libpng license	Jean-Loup Gailly and Mark Adler	—N/a	April 15, 1995	Permissive	Permissive	Permissive	Manually	Yes	Permissive	Manually

Other licenses that don't have information:

license	Author	Latest version	Publication date
Eiffel Forum License	NICE	2	2002
Intel Open Source License	Intel Corporation	—N/a	?
RealNetworks Public Source License	RealNetworks	?	?
Reciprocal Public License	Scott Shattuck	1.5	2007
Sun Industry Standards Source License	Sun Microsystems	?	?
Sun Public License	Sun Microsystems	?	?
Sybase Open Watcom Public License	Open Watcom	—N/a	2003-01-28
Zope Public License	Zope Foundation	2.1	?
Server Side Public License	MongoDB	1.0	2018-10-16

== Approvals ==
This table lists for each license what organizations from the FOSS community have approved it – be it as a "free software" or as an "open source" license – , how those organizations categorize it, and the license compatibility between them for a combined or mixed derivative work. Organizations usually approve specific versions of software licenses. For instance, a FSF approval means that the Free Software Foundation (FSF) considers a license to be free-software license. The FSF recommends at least "Compatible with GPL" and preferably copyleft. The OSI recommends a mix of permissive and copyleft licenses, the Apache License 2.0, 2- & 3-clause BSD license, GPL, LGPL, MIT license, MPL 2.0, CDDL and EPL.

License and version	FSF approval	GPL (v3) compatibility	OSI approval	Debian approval	Fedora approval
Academic Free License	Yes	No	Yes	No	Yes
Apache License 1.x	Yes	No	Yes	Yes	Yes
Apache License 2.0	Yes	GPLv3 only	Yes	Yes	Yes
Apple Public Source License 1.x	No	No	Yes	No	No
Apple Public Source License 2.0	Yes	No	Yes	No	Yes
Artistic License 1.0	No (Note: The original version of the Artistic License is defined as non-free because it is overly vague, not because of the substance of the license. The FSF encourages projects to use the Clarified Artistic License instead.)	No	Yes	Yes	No
Artistic License 2.0	Yes	Yes	Yes	Yes	Yes
Beerware License	see "Informal license" section	see "Informal license" section	No	No	Yes
Original BSD license	Yes	No	No	Yes	Yes
Revised BSD license	Yes	Yes	Yes	Yes	Yes
Simplified BSD license	Yes	Yes	Yes	Yes	Yes
Zero-Clause BSD License	Yes	Yes	Yes	?	Yes
Boost Software License	Yes	Yes	Yes	Yes	Yes
CeCILL	Yes	Yes	Yes	Yes	Yes
Common Development and Distribution License	Yes	GPLv3 (GPLv2 disputed)	Yes	Yes	Yes
Common Public License	Yes	No	Yes	Yes	Yes
Creative Commons Zero	Yes	Yes	No	Yes	Yes
Creative Commons BY-SA 4.0	Yes	GPLv3	?	Yes	?
Cryptix General License	Yes	Yes	Yes	Yes	Yes
Eclipse Public License	Yes	No	Yes	Yes	Yes
Educational Community License	Yes	Yes	Yes	No	Yes
Eiffel Forum License 2	Yes	Yes	Yes	Yes	Yes
European Union Public Licence	Yes	Yes	Yes	Yes	Yes
GNU Affero General Public License	Yes	Yes	Yes	Yes	Yes
GNU General Public License v2	Yes	No (Note: But can be made compatible by upgrading to GPLv3 via the optional "or later" clause added in most GPLv2 license texts.)	Yes	Yes	Yes
GNU General Public License v3	Yes	Yes (Note: But not with GPLv2 without "or later" clause.)	Yes	Yes	Yes
GNU Lesser General Public License	Yes	Yes	Yes	Yes	Yes
GNU Free Documentation License	Yes	No	Yes	No	No
IBM Public License	Yes	No	Yes	Yes	Yes
Intel Open Source License	Yes	Yes	Yes	No	No
ISC license	Yes	Yes	Yes	Yes	Yes
LaTeX Project Public License	Yes	No	Yes	Yes	Yes
Microsoft Public License	Yes	No	Yes	No	Yes
Microsoft Reciprocal License	Yes	No	Yes	No	Yes
MIT license / X11 license	Yes	Yes	Yes	Yes	Yes
MIT No Attribution License	Yes	Yes	Yes	?	Yes
Mozilla Public License 1.1	Yes	No	Yes	Yes	Yes
Mozilla Public License 2.0	Yes	Yes (Note: MPL 2.0 is GPL compatible unless marked "Incompatible with Secondary Licenses".)	Yes	Yes	Yes
NASA Open Source Agreement	No	No	Yes	?	No
Netscape Public License	Yes	No	No	No	Yes
Open Software License	Yes	No	Yes	No	Yes
OpenSSL license	Yes	No	No	Yes	Yes
PHP License	Yes	No	Yes	Yes	Yes
Python Software Foundation License 2.0.1; 2.1.1 and newer	Yes	Yes	Yes	Yes	Yes
Q Public License	Yes	No	Yes	No	Yes
Reciprocal Public License 1.5	No	No	Yes	No	No
Sleepycat License	Yes	Yes	Yes	Yes	Yes
Sun Industry Standards Source License	Yes	No	Yes	No	Yes
Sun Public License	Yes	No	Yes	No	Yes
Sybase Open Watcom Public License	No	No	Yes	No	No
Unlicense	Yes	Yes	Yes	?	Yes
W3C Software Notice and License	Yes	Yes	Yes	Yes	Yes
Do What The Fuck You Want To Public License (WTFPL)	Yes (Note: Listed as WTFPL.)	Yes	No	Yes	Yes
XFree86 1.1 License	Yes	Yes	No	No	No
zlib/libpng license	Yes	Yes	Yes	Yes	Yes
Zope Public License 1.0	Yes	No	No	No	Yes
Zope Public License 2.0	Yes	Yes	Yes	No	Yes

== See also ==
- Creative Commons licenses
- Free software
- Free-software license
- List of free and open-source software packages
- List of free and open-source software organizations
- List of open-source hardware projects
- List of open-source programming languages
- List of open-source video games
- List of public domain projects
- Open-source license
- Open-source software
- Open weights
- Source-available software
- SPDX-License-identifier
- License proliferation
- European Union Public Licence
