= GNU Lesser General Public License =

Free-software license

- Logo
- Published: 1991; 35 years ago
- SPDX identifier: LGPL-3.0-or-later; LGPL-3.0-only; LGPL-2.1-or-later; LGPL-2.1-only; LGPL-2.0-or-later; LGPL-2.0-only
- Debian FSG compatible: Yes
- FSF approved: Yes
- OSI approved: Yes
- GPL compatible: Yes
- Copyleft: Yes (library or dynamic linking-based)
- Linking from code with a different license: Yes
- Website: www.gnu.org/licenses/lgpl.html

The GNU Lesser General Public License (LGPL) is a free-software license published by the Free Software Foundation (FSF). The license allows developers and companies to use and integrate a software component released under the LGPL into their own (even proprietary) software without being required by the terms of a strong copyleft license to release the source code of their own components. However, any developer who modifies an LGPL-covered component is required to make their modified version available under the same LGPL license. For proprietary software, code under the LGPL is usually used in the form of a shared library, so that there is a clear separation between the proprietary and LGPL components. The LGPL is primarily used for software libraries, although it is also used by some stand-alone applications.

The LGPL was developed as a compromise between the strong copyleft of the GNU General Public License (GPL) and more permissive licenses such as the BSD licenses and the MIT License. The word "Lesser" in the title shows that the LGPL does not guarantee the end user's complete freedom in the use of software; it only guarantees the freedom of modification for components licensed under the LGPL, but not for any proprietary components.

== History ==
The license was originally called the GNU Library General Public License and was first published in 1991, and adopted the version number 2 for parity with GPL version 2. The LGPL was revised in minor ways in the 2.1 point release, published in 1999, when it was renamed the GNU Lesser General Public License to reflect the FSF's position that not all libraries should use it. Version 3 of the LGPL was published in 2007 as a list of additional permissions applied to GPL version 3.

In addition to the term "work based on the Program" of GPL, LGPL version 2 introduced two additional clarification terms "work based on the library" and "work that uses the library". LGPL version 3 partially dropped these terms.

== Differences from the GPL ==
The main difference between the GPL and the LGPL is that the latter allows the work to be linked with (in the case of a library, "used by") a non-(L)GPLed program, regardless of whether it is licensed under a license of GPL family or other licenses. In LGPL 2.1, the non-(L)GPLed program can then be distributed under any terms if it is not a derivative work. If it is a derivative work, then the program's terms must allow for "modification of the work for the customer's own use and reverse engineering for debugging such modifications". Whether a work that uses an LGPL program is a derivative work or not is a legal issue. A standalone executable that dynamically links to a library through a .so, .dll, or similar medium is generally accepted as not being a derivative work as defined by the LGPL. It would fall under the definition of a "work that uses the Library". Paragraph 5 of the LGPL version 2.1 states:

A program that contains no derivative of any portion of the Library, but is designed to work with the Library by being compiled or linked with it, is called a "work that uses the Library". Such a work, in isolation, is not a derivative work of the Library, and therefore falls outside the scope of this License.

Essentially, if it is a "work that uses the library", then it must be possible for the software to be linked with a newer version of the LGPL-covered program. The most commonly used method for doing so is to use "a suitable shared library mechanism for linking". Alternatively, a statically linked library is allowed if either source code or linkable object files are provided.

== Compatibility ==
Free Software Foundation's Software Licenses list explains the compatibility with many open source licenses.

=== GPL ===
One feature of the LGPL is the permission to sublicense under the GPL any piece of software which is received under the LGPL (see section 3 of the LGPL version 2.1, and section 2 option b of the LGPL version 3). This feature allows for direct reuse of LGPLed code in GPLed libraries and applications.

Version 3 of the LGPL is not inherently compatible with version 2 of the GPL. However, works using the latter that have given permission to use a later version of the GPL are compatible: a work released under the GPLv2 "or any later version" may be combined with code from a LGPL version 3 library, with the combined work as a whole falling under the terms of the GPLv3.

=== Expat/X11/MIT ===
All LGPL versions are compatible with the Expat license and the X11 license (MIT license) because all GPL versions are compatible and LGPL gives more rights than GPL.

=== Apache ===
LGPL 3.0 is compatible with Apache License 2.0. LGPL 2.0 and LGPL 2.1 are incompatible with Apache License 2.0. However, if the license condition is either LGPL-2.0-or-later or LGPL-2.1-or-later then LGPL 3.0 can be chosen to be compatible.

All LGPL versions are incompatible with Apache License version 1.0 and 1.1.

== FSF recommendations on library licensing ==
The former name GNU Library General Public License gave some the impression that the FSF recommended that all software libraries should use the LGPL and programs should use the GPL. In the 1999 essay Why you shouldn't use the Lesser GPL for your next library, Richard Stallman explained that while the LGPL had not been deprecated, one should not necessarily use the LGPL for all libraries, as using GPL can give advantage to free-software developers.

== Programming language specifications ==
The license uses terminology which is mainly intended for applications written in the C programming language or its family. Franz Inc., the developers of Allegro Common Lisp, published their own preamble to the license to clarify terminology in the Lisp context. The LGPL with this preamble is sometimes referred to as the LLGPL.

In addition, Ada has a special feature, generics, which may prompt the use of the GNAT Modified General Public License (GMGPL): it allows code to link against or instantiate GMGPL-covered units without the code itself becoming covered by the GPL.

C++ templates and header-only libraries have the same problem as Ada generics. Version 3 of the LGPL addresses such cases in section 3.

=== Class inheritance ===
Some concern has risen about the suitability of object-oriented classes in LGPL-licensed code being inherited by non-(L)GPL code. Clarification is given on the official GNU website:

The LGPL does not contain special provisions for inheritance, because none are needed. Inheritance creates derivative works in the same way as traditional linking, and the LGPL permits this type of derivative work in the same way as it permits ordinary function calls.

== See also ==
- GNU Affero General Public License
- GNU Free Documentation License
- GNAT Modified General Public License
- GPL linking exception
- Software using the GNU Lesser General Public License (category)
