= Apache License =

Permissive software license

- The Apache Software Foundation logo
- Author: The Apache Software Foundation
- Latest version: 2.0
- Publisher: The Apache Software Foundation
- Published: January 2004; 22 years ago
- SPDX identifier: Apache-2.0; Apache-1.1; Apache-1.0
- Debian FSG compatible: Yes
- FSF approved: Yes
- OSI approved: Yes
- GPL compatible: Yes (Version 2.0 only → GPLv3 only)
- Copyleft: No
- Linking from code with a different license: Yes
- Website: apache.org/licenses

The Apache License is a permissive free-software and free and open source software license written by the Apache Software Foundation (ASF). It allows users to use the software for any purpose, to distribute it, to modify it, and to distribute modified versions of the software under the terms of the license, without concern for royalties. The ASF and its projects release their software products under the Apache License. The license is also used by many non-ASF projects.

== History ==
Beginning in 1995, the Apache Group (later the Apache Software Foundation) released successive versions of the Apache HTTP Server. Its initial license was essentially the same as the original 4-clause BSD license, with only the names of the organizations changed, and with an additional clause forbidding derivative works from bearing the Apache name.

In July 1999, the Berkeley Software Distribution accepted the argument put to it by the Free Software Foundation and retired their advertising clause (clause 3) to form the new 3-clause BSD license. In 2000, Apache did likewise and created the Apache License 1.1, in which derived products are no longer required to include attribution in their advertising materials, only in their documentation. Individual packages licensed under the 1.1 version may have used different wording due to varying requirements for attribution or mark identification, but the binding terms were the same.

In January 2004, ASF decided to depart from the BSD model and produced the Apache License 2.0. The stated goals of the license included making it easier for non-ASF projects to use, improving compatibility with GPL-based software, allowing the license to be included by reference instead of listed in every file, clarifying the license on contributions, and requiring a patent license on contributions that necessarily infringe a contributor's own patents. This license requires the preservation of the copyright notice and disclaimer v.d

== Licensing condition ==
The Apache License is permissive; unlike copyleft licenses, it does not require a derivative work of the software, or modifications to the original, to be distributed using the same license. It still requires application of the same license to all unmodified parts. In every licensed file, original copyright, patent, trademark, and attribution notices must be preserved (excluding notices that do not pertain to any part of the derivative works). In every licensed file changed, a notification must be added stating that changes have been made to that file.

If a NOTICE text file is included as part of the distribution of the original work, then derivative works must include a readable copy of these notices within a NOTICE text file distributed as part of the derivative works, within the source form or documentation, or within a display generated by the derivative works (wherever such third-party notices normally appear).

The contents of the NOTICE file do not modify the license, as they are for informational purposes only, and adding more attribution notices as addenda to the NOTICE text is permissible, provided that these notices cannot be understood as modifying the license. Modifications may have appropriate copyright notices, and may provide different license terms for the modifications.

Unless explicitly stated otherwise, any contributions submitted by a licensee to a licensor will be under the terms of the license without any terms and conditions, but this does not preclude any separate agreements with the licensor regarding these contributions.

=== Apache License 2.0 ===
The Apache License 2.0 attempts to forestall potential patent litigation in Section 3. The user is granted a patent license from each contributor to "make, have made, use, offer to sell, sell, import, and otherwise transfer the Work." Through an in terrorem clause, if the user sues anyone alleging that the software or a contribution within it constitutes patent infringement, any such patent licenses for that work are terminated.

== Compatibility ==
The Apache Software Foundation and the Free Software Foundation agree that the Apache License 2.0 is a free-software license, compatible with the GNU General Public License (GPL) version 3, meaning that code under GPLv3 and Apache License 2.0 can be combined, as long as the resulting software is licensed under the GPLv3.

The Free Software Foundation considers all versions of the Apache License to be incompatible with the previous GPL versions 1 and 2. Furthermore, it considers Apache License versions before 2.0 incompatible with GPLv3. Because of version 2.0's patent license requirements, the Free Software Foundation recommends it over other non-copyleft licenses. If the Apache License with the LLVM exception is used, then it is compatible with GPLv2.

== Reception and adoption ==
In October 2012, 8,708 projects located at SourceForge.net were available under the terms of the Apache License. In a blog post from May 2008, Google mentioned that over 25% of the nearly 100,000 projects then hosted on Google Code were using the Apache License, including the Android operating system.

As of 2015, according to Black Duck Software and GitHub, the Apache license is the third most popular license in the FOSS domain after MIT License and GPLv2.

The OpenBSD project does not consider the Apache License 2.0 to be an acceptable free license because of its patent provisions. The OpenBSD policy believes that when the license forces one to give up a legal right that one otherwise has, that license is no longer free. Moreover, the project objects to involving contract law with copyright law, stating "...Copyright law is somewhat standardized by international agreements, contract law differs wildly among jurisdictions. So what the license means in different jurisdictions may vary and is hard to predict."

== See also ==
- Comparison of free and open-source software licenses
- List of Apache Software Foundation projects
- Software using the Apache license (category)
