= MIT License =

Permissive free software license

- Publisher: Massachusetts Institute of Technology
- SPDX identifier: MIT (see list for more)
- Debian FSG compatible: Yes
- FSF approved: Yes
- OSI approved: Yes
- GPL compatible: Yes
- Copyleft: No
- Linking from code with a different license: Yes

The MIT License is a permissive software license originating at the Massachusetts Institute of Technology (MIT) in the late 1980s. As a permissive license, it puts few restrictions on reuse and has high license compatibility.

Unlike copyleft software licenses, the MIT License allows reuse within proprietary software, provided that all copies of the software or its substantial portions include a copy of the terms of the MIT License and also a copyright notice. In 2015 and from at least 2020 through 2025, the MIT License was the most popular software license on GitHub.

Notable projects that use the MIT License include the X Window System, Ruby on Rails, Node.js, Lua, jQuery, .NET, Angular, and React.

== License terms ==
The MIT License has the identifier MIT in the SPDX License List. It is also known as the "Expat License". It has the following terms:

Copyright (c) <year> <copyright holders>

Permission is hereby granted, free of charge, to any person obtaining a copy of this software and associated documentation files (the "Software"), to deal in the Software without restriction, including without limitation the rights to use, copy, modify, merge, publish, distribute, sublicense, and/or sell copies of the Software, and to permit persons to whom the Software is furnished to do so, subject to the following conditions:

The above copyright notice and this permission notice shall be included in all copies or substantial portions of the Software.

THE SOFTWARE IS PROVIDED "AS IS", WITHOUT WARRANTY OF ANY KIND, EXPRESS OR IMPLIED, INCLUDING BUT NOT LIMITED TO THE WARRANTIES OF MERCHANTABILITY, FITNESS FOR A PARTICULAR PURPOSE AND NONINFRINGEMENT. IN NO EVENT SHALL THE AUTHORS OR COPYRIGHT HOLDERS BE LIABLE FOR ANY CLAIM, DAMAGES OR OTHER LIABILITY, WHETHER IN AN ACTION OF CONTRACT, TORT OR OTHERWISE, ARISING FROM, OUT OF OR IN CONNECTION WITH THE SOFTWARE OR THE USE OR OTHER DEALINGS IN THE SOFTWARE.

== History ==
Computer scientist Jerry Saltzer has published his recollections of its early development, along with documentary evidence. According to Saltzer, the idea for the license came when working on a TCP/IP implementation in the Computer Systems Research (CSR) Group of the MIT Laboratory for Computer Science (MIT-LCS). The group believed that licensing revenue for their software would be small, and wanted to avoid what could sometimes be a large amount of time working with MIT's attorneys negotiating licensing agreements, so they decided to give the software away for free with a copyright notice. Saltzer and Larry Allen worked with attorneys to draft and refine the proposal wording, versions of which were circulated to attorneys by email on January 10, 1984 and used in software publication on February 1, 1984. A new version of the license was put together later in 1985 for the development and release of the X Window System and Project Athena, and was released in February 1986.

== Variations ==
=== X11 License ===
The X11 License, also known as the MIT/X Consortium License, is a variation on the MIT license, most known for its usage by the X Consortium. It has the identifier X11 in the SPDX License List.

It differs from the MIT License mainly by an additional clause restricting use of the copyright holders' name for advertisement.

It has the following terms:

Copyright (C) <date> <copyright holders>

Permission is hereby granted, free of charge, to any person obtaining a copy of this software and associated documentation files (the "Software"), to deal in the Software without restriction, including without limitation the rights to use, copy, modify, merge, publish, distribute, sublicense, and/or sell copies of the Software, and to permit persons to whom the Software is furnished to do so, subject to the following conditions:

The above copyright notice and this permission notice shall be included in all copies or substantial portions of the Software.

THE SOFTWARE IS PROVIDED "AS IS", WITHOUT WARRANTY OF ANY KIND, EXPRESS OR IMPLIED, INCLUDING BUT NOT LIMITED TO THE WARRANTIES OF MERCHANTABILITY, FITNESS FOR A PARTICULAR PURPOSE AND NONINFRINGEMENT. IN NO EVENT SHALL THE X CONSORTIUM BE LIABLE FOR ANY CLAIM, DAMAGES OR OTHER LIABILITY, WHETHER IN AN ACTION OF CONTRACT, TORT OR OTHERWISE, ARISING FROM, OUT OF OR IN CONNECTION WITH THE SOFTWARE OR THE USE OR OTHER DEALINGS IN THE SOFTWARE.

Except as contained in this notice, the name of <copyright holders> shall not be used in advertising or otherwise to promote the sale, use or other dealings in this Software without prior written authorization from <copyright holders>.

=== MIT No Attribution License ===
MIT No Attribution License
- Author: Roman Mamedov, Amazon Web Services
- Published: 28 March 2018
- SPDX identifier: MIT-0
- Debian FSG compatible: n/a
- FSF approved: Yes
- OSI approved: Yes
- GPL compatible: Yes
- Copyleft: No
- Linking from code with a different license: Yes
- Website: https://github.com/aws/mit-0

The MIT No Attribution License, a variation of the MIT License, has the identifier MIT-0 in the SPDX License List. A request for legacy approval to the Open Source Initiative was filed on May 15, 2020, which led to a formal approval on August 5, 2020. By doing so, it forms a public-domain-equivalent license, the same way as BSD Zero Clause. It has the following terms:

MIT No Attribution

Copyright <YEAR> <COPYRIGHT HOLDER>

Permission is hereby granted, free of charge, to any person obtaining a copy of this software and associated documentation files (the "Software"), to deal in the Software without restriction, including without limitation the rights to use, copy, modify, merge, publish, distribute, sublicense, and/or sell copies of the Software, and to permit persons to whom the Software is furnished to do so.

THE SOFTWARE IS PROVIDED "AS IS", WITHOUT WARRANTY OF ANY KIND, EXPRESS OR IMPLIED, INCLUDING BUT NOT LIMITED TO THE WARRANTIES OF MERCHANTABILITY, FITNESS FOR A PARTICULAR PURPOSE AND NONINFRINGEMENT. IN NO EVENT SHALL THE AUTHORS OR COPYRIGHT HOLDERS BE LIABLE FOR ANY CLAIM, DAMAGES OR OTHER LIABILITY, WHETHER IN AN ACTION OF CONTRACT, TORT OR OTHERWISE, ARISING FROM, OUT OF OR IN CONNECTION WITH THE SOFTWARE OR THE USE OR OTHER DEALINGS IN THE SOFTWARE.

=== Other variations ===
The SPDX License List contains extra MIT license variations. Examples include MIT-advertising, a variation with an additional advertising clause, and MITNFA, a variation which covers the removal or replacement of attributions in cases the software is significantly modified for bug reporting purposes.

== Ambiguity and variants ==
The name "MIT License" is potentially ambiguous. The Massachusetts Institute of Technology has used many licenses for software since its creation; for example, MIT offers four licensing options for the FFTW C source code library, one of which is the GPL v2.0 and the other three of which are not open-source. The term "MIT License" has also been used to refer to the Expat License (used for the XML parsing library Expat) and to the X11 License (also called "MIT/X Consortium License"; used for X Window System by the MIT X Consortium). Furthermore, the "MIT License" as published by the Open Source Initiative is the same as the Expat License. Due to this differing use of terms, some prefer to avoid the name "MIT License". The Free Software Foundation argues that the term is misleading and ambiguous, and recommends against its use.

The X Consortium was dissolved late in 1996, and its assets transferred to The Open Group, which released X11R6 initially under the same license. The X11 License and the X11R6 "MIT License" chosen for ncurses and continued to be used after copyright transfer to the Free Software Foundation both include the following clause, absent in the Expat License:

Except as contained in this notice, the name(s) of the above copyright holders shall not be used in advertising or otherwise to promote the sale, use or other dealings in this Software without prior written authorization.

As of 2020, the successor to the X Window System is the X.Org Server, which is licensed under what is effectively the common MIT license, according to the X.org licensing page:

The X.Org Foundation has chosen the following format of the MIT License as the preferred format for code included in the X Window System distribution. This is a slight variant of the common MIT license form published by the Open Source Initiative

The "slight variant" is the addition of the phrase "(including the next paragraph)" to the second paragraph of the license text, resulting in: "The above copyright notice and this permission notice (including the next paragraph) shall be included in all copies or substantial portions of the Software." This inclusion clarifies that the liability paragraph must also be included for the conditions of the license to be met.

The license-management features at popular source code repository GitHub, as well as its "Choose a License" service, do not differentiate between MIT/Expat license variants. The text of the Expat variant is presented as simply the "MIT License" (represented by the metadata tag mit).

== Comparison to other licenses ==
=== BSD ===
The original BSD license also includes a clause requiring all advertising of the software to display a notice crediting its authors. This "advertising clause" (since disavowed by UC Berkeley) is present in the modified MIT License used by XFree86.

The University of Illinois/NCSA Open Source License combines text from both the MIT and BSD licenses; the license grant and disclaimer are taken from the MIT License.

The ISC license contains similarities to both the MIT and simplified BSD licenses, the biggest difference being that language deemed unnecessary by the Berne Convention is omitted.

=== GNU General Public License ===
The GPL is explicit about the patent rights an owner grants when the code or derivative work is distributed, while the MIT license does not discuss patents. Moreover, the GPL license impacts derivative works, but the MIT license does not.

== Relation to patents ==
Like the BSD license, the MIT license does not include an express patent license although some commentators state that the grant of rights covers all potential restrictions including patents. Both the BSD and the MIT licenses were drafted before the patentability of software was generally recognized under US law. The Apache License version 2.0 is a similarly permissive license that includes an explicit contributor's patent license. Of specific relevance to US jurisdictions, the MIT license uses the terms "sell" and "use" that are also used in defining the rights of a patent holder in Title 35 of the United States Code section 154. This has been construed by some commentators as an unconventional but implicit license in the US to use any underlying patents.

== Reception and popularity ==
According to a 2020 post by WhiteSource Software, the MIT license was used in 27% of four million open source packages. In a 2015 GitHub blog post, the MIT license was the most popular open-source license, used by 45% of repositories, with the GNU GPLv2 coming second at 13% in their sample of repositories.

GitHub's 2025 Innovation Graph found that repositories under the MIT License account for about one-third of all projects on the platform that declare a license, giving it the largest share of any license tracked. The Open Source Initiative reported that its MIT License page drew more than a million unique visitors in 2024—over four times the traffic of the next most-viewed OSI-approved license.

== See also ==
- Comparison of free and open-source software licenses
- ISC license—similar to the MIT license, but with language deemed unnecessary removed
- Category:Software using the MIT license
