= Open Source Initiative =

Non-profit organization promoting open-source software

- Formation: February 8, 1998 (28 years ago)
- Type: Standards organization
- Location: West Hollywood, California, U.S.
- Region served: Worldwide
- Interim Executive Director: Deborah Bryant (September 2025 – present)
- Board of directors: Anne-Marie Scott, Carlo Piana, Catharina Maracke, Chris Aniszczyk, Gaël Blondelle, Josh Berkus, Ruth Suehle, McCoy Smith
- Revenue: $811,527 (2023)
- Website: opensource.org

The Open Source Initiative (OSI) is an American nonprofit organization that maintains The Open Source Definition (OSD), the predominant standard for open-source software. The organization was founded in February 1998 by Bruce Perens and Eric S. Raymond, part of a group inspired by the Netscape Communications Corporation publishing the source code for its flagship Netscape Communicator product. Later, in August 1998, the organization added a board of directors.

For most of its existence, the OSI's activities have been focused on the definition and certifying software licenses as compliant with it. OSI originally had a closed organizational model, but began to switch towards a membership organization in the 2010s to raise more money and expand its activities.

== History ==
As a campaign of sorts, "open source" was launched in 1998 by Christine Peterson, Jon "maddog" Hall, Larry Augustin, Eric S. Raymond, Bruce Perens, and others.

The group adopted The Open Source Definition (OSD) for open-source software, based on the Debian Free Software Guidelines. They also established the Open Source Initiative (OSI) as a steward organization for the movement. However, they were unsuccessful in their attempt to secure a trademark for 'open source' to control the use of the term.

In 2012, under the leadership of OSI director and then-president Simon Phipps, the OSI began transitioning towards a membership-based governance structure. The OSI initiated an Affiliate Membership program for "government-recognized non-profit charitable and not-for-profit industry associations and academic institutions anywhere in the world". Subsequently, the OSI announced an Individual Membership program and listed a number of Corporate Sponsors.

On November 8, 2013, OSI appointed Patrick Masson as its general manager. From August 2020 to September 2021, Deb Nicholson was the interim general manager. During the OSI's March 2021 board election, the OSI discovered that at least one voter had exploited a security vulnerability to submit multiple votes; the election results were discarded and the OSI held the election again.

Co-founder Perens resigned from the OSI in January 2020 in response to the organization's then-impending approval of the Cryptographic Autonomy License. Prior to his departure, Perens wrote on the OSI mailing list that the license "isn't freedom respecting", and in a later interview with The Register, he expressed concern about license proliferation, stating that the AGPLv3, LGPLv3, and Apache 2.0 licenses were sufficient.

In November 2020, the board of directors announced a search for an executive director, which was concluded in September 2021 with the appointment of Stefano Maffulli. At the same time, the role of president of the board was abandoned in favor of chair of the board. Maffulli stepped down in September 2025. Deborah Bryant is serving as interim executive director.

In 2025, elections for the board of directors were criticized for many missteps. These included a mistake in communicating the number of seats, which were corrected only after nominations had closed, and the exclusion of three candidates who didn't sign an agreement required after the vote took place and before the votes were counted. Voters and other members of open source communities raised concerns about the lack of transparency and the fact that two of the excluded candidates had expressed opinion contrasting those of current directors, and asked to publish the complete tallies (which were retained for excluded candidates) and to invalidate and repeat the election. OSI declined such requests and hold the elections valid.

In January 2026, it was announced that the board of directors had voted to redesign the board member selection process and to suspend 2026 board elections until then.

== Governance ==
The OSI is a California public-benefit nonprofit corporation, with 501(c)(3) tax-exempt status. The organization is professionally overseen by an Executive Director and staff, and supported by its Board of Directors responsible for overseeing duty of care, fiduciary duty, and strategic alignment to mission.

== The Open Source Definition ==
The Open Source Definition (OSD) is the most widely accepted standard for open-source software. Providing access to the source code is not enough for software to be considered "open-source": it must also allow modification and redistribution under the same terms and all uses, including commercial use. The Open Source Definition requires that ten criteria be met for a license to be approved. It allows both copyleft—where redistribution and derivative works must be released under a free license—and permissive licenses—where derivative works can be released under any license. Software licenses covered by the Open Source Definition also mostly meet the Free Software Definition and vice versa, except for unreleased software. Both the Free Software Foundation and the OSI share the goal of supporting free and open-source software.

=== License approval process ===
The OSI approves certain licenses as compatible with the definition, and maintains a list of compliant licenses. New licenses have to submit a formal proposal explaining the rationale for the license, comparison with existing approved licenses, and any legal analysis. The proposal is discussed on the OSI mailing list for at least 30 days before being brought to a vote and approved or rejected by the OSI board. Although the OSI has made an effort to have a transparent process, the approval process has been a source of controversy.

Seven approved licenses are particularly recommended by the OSI as "popular, widely used, or having strong communities":

1. Apache License 2.0
2. BSD 3-Clause and BSD 2-Clause Licenses
3. All versions of the GPL
4. All versions of the LGPL
5. MIT License
6. Mozilla Public License 2.0
7. Common Development and Distribution License (CDDL)
8. Eclipse Public License version 2.0

== The Open Source AI Definition ==
In 2022, the OSI began work on The Open Source AI Definition (OSAID) in conjunction with researchers, developers, and industry representatives; version 1.0 was released in October 2024. The definition was criticized by some AI company employees.

== See also ==
- Digital rights
- Comparison of open-source and closed-source software
- Business models for open-source software
- Commons-based peer production – an economic model for organizing projects without leaders or financial compensation
- Open-source governance – use of open-source principles to transform human social governance
- Techno-progressivism – a stance of active support for the convergence of technological change and social progress
- Open-source-software movement – the evolution and evidence of the open-source ideology
- Open data and Linked data
