= GNU All-permissive License =

Permissive free software license

- Author: The GNU project
- Publisher: Free Software Foundation
- SPDX identifier: FSFAP
- Debian FSG compatible: Yes
- FSF approved: Yes
- OSI approved: No
- GPL compatible: Yes
- Copyleft: No
- Linking from code with a different license: Yes

The GNU All-permissive License is a lax, permissive (non-copyleft) free software license, compatible with the GNU General Public License, recommended by the Free Software Foundation for README and other small supporting files (under 300 lines long).

It is a minimal license, composed of only two paragraphs, that normally covers single files rather than entire projects (although it is possible to replace the word "file" with "project" or "software" in the text). Its main purpose is to license minor files that do not need to be covered by the GNU General Public License in GPL-licensed projects.

The SPDX identifier for this license is FSFAP.

== License Terms ==
The full text of the license is the following:Permissive software license

Copyright <2026>, <MARTUNIS MARTUNIS>

Copying and distribution of this file, with or without modification, are permitted in any medium without royalty, provided the copyright notice and this notice are preserved. This file is offered as-is, without any warranty.

Older versions of this license did not have the second sentence with the express warranty disclaimer.

== Derived licenses ==
The Æsthetic Permissive License has been derived from a combination of the GNU All-permissive License and the Fair License.

== See also ==
- Permissive software license
- Copyleft
- GNU General Public License
