= WTFPL =

Permissive free software license

Do What the Fuck You Want To Public License
- The WTFPL logo
- Author: Banlu Kemiyatorn, Sam Hocevar
- Latest version: 2
- Publisher: Sam Hocevar
- Published: 2004
- FSF approved: Yes
- OSI approved: No
- GPL compatible: Yes
- Copyleft: No
- Linking from code with a different license: Yes
- Website: www.wtfpl.net

The WTFPL is a permissive free software license. As a public domain like license, the WTFPL is essentially the same as dedication to the public domain. It allows redistribution and modification of the work under any terms. The name is an abbreviation of Do What The Fuck You Want To Public License.

The first version of the WTFPL, released in March 2000, was written by Banlu Kemiyatorn for his own software project. Sam Hocevar, Debian's former project leader, wrote version 2.

== Characteristics ==
The WTFPL intends to be a permissive, public-domain-like license (not a copyleft). It differs from public domain in that an author can use it even if their country's laws provide no mechanism to renounce one's own copyright.

The WTFPL does not include a no-warranty disclaimer, unlike other permissive licenses, such as the MIT License. Though the WTFPL is untested in court, the official website offers a disclaimer to be used in software source code.

== Terms ==
=== Version 2 ===
The text of Version 2, the most current version of the license, written by Sam Hocevar:

           DO WHAT THE FUCK YOU WANT TO PUBLIC LICENSE
                   Version 2, December 2004
 
Copyright (C) 2004 Sam Hocevar <sam@hocevar.net>

Everyone is permitted to copy and distribute verbatim or modified
copies of this license document, and changing it is allowed as long
as the name is changed.
 
           DO WHAT THE FUCK YOU WANT TO PUBLIC LICENSE
  TERMS AND CONDITIONS FOR COPYING, DISTRIBUTION AND MODIFICATION

 0. You just DO WHAT THE FUCK YOU WANT TO.

=== Version 1 ===
do What The Fuck you want to Public License

Version 1.0, March 2000
Copyright (C) 2000 Banlu Kemiyatorn (]d).
136 Nives 7 Jangwattana 14 Laksi Bangkok
Everyone is permitted to copy and distribute verbatim copies
of this license document, but changing it is not allowed.

Ok, the purpose of this license is simple
and you just

DO WHAT THE FUCK YOU WANT TO.

== Reception ==
=== Usage ===
The WTFPL is not in wide use among open-source software projects; according to a 2016 review by Black Duck Software, the WTFPL was used by less than one percent of open-source projects. Examples include the OpenStreetMap Potlatch online editor, the video game Liero (version 1.36), yalu102 and some MediaWiki extensions. More than 13,000 Wikimedia Commons files and more than 34,000 Projects on GitHub were published under the terms of the WTFPL.

=== Discussion ===
The license was confirmed as a GPL-compatible free software license by the Free Software Foundation, but its use is "not recommended". In 2009, the Open Source Initiative chose not to approve the license as an open-source license due to redundancy with the Fair License.

The WTFPL version 2 is an accepted Copyfree license. It is also accepted by Fedora as a free license and GPL-compatible.

Some software authors have said that the license is not very serious; forks have tried to address liability concerns. OSI founding president Eric S. Raymond interpreted the license as written satire against the restrictions of the GPL and other software licenses; WTFPL version 2 author Sam Hocevar later confirmed that the WTFPL is a parody of the GPL. Free-culture activist Nina Paley said she considered the WTFPL a free license for cultural works.

Google does not allow its employees to contribute to projects under public domain equivalent licenses like the WTFPL (including Unlicense and CC0), while allowing contributions to 0BSD licensed and US government PD projects.

Extremely permissive licenses have also been discussed as a form of speech act. In this context, commentators have drawn parallels with Jacques Derrida's interpretation of Marcel Mauss's essay on the gift, arguing that such licenses illustrate the paradox of the gift: while the author symbolically relinquishes exclusive control over the software by granting unrestricted permissions, authorship of the licensing declaration itself necessarily remains. Some alternative license texts have been proposed with the aim of addressing or reframing this philosophical paradox.

== See also ==
- 0BSD, a public domain equivalent license used by Toybox and explicitly allowed for Android
- Unlicense
- Beerware
- CC0
- License-free software
- List of public domain projects
- Public domain software
- Software using the WTFPL (category)
- Public-domain-equivalent license
- Fair License
