= LOSP =

LOSP may refer to:

- Lake Ontario State Parkway
- Liero Open Source Project
- Legion of Super-Pets
