= Lucas Grandin =

French artist (b. 1976)

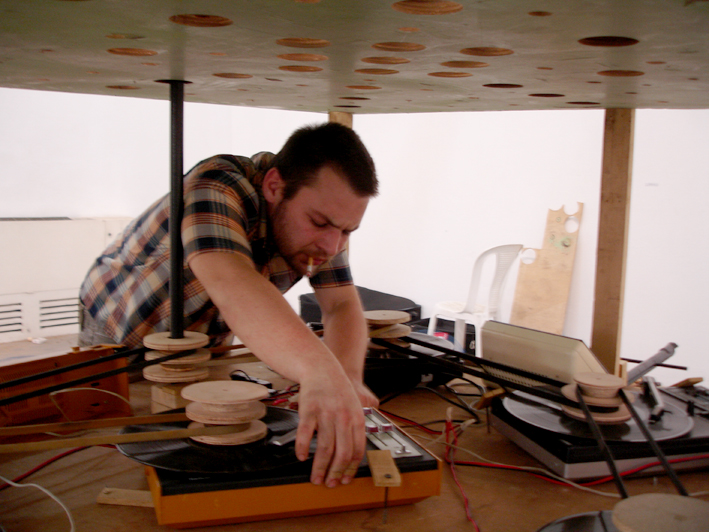
- Lucas Grandin
- Born: 1976 (age 49–50); Le Mans, France

Lucas Grandin (born 1976 in Le Mans, France) is an artist, curator, teacher, and active initiator of various projects. Lucas Grandin has developed an approach combining sound, video, light, low-tech with a particular focus on the urban planning and architecture. Currently he lives and works in Sarthe, France.

== Biography ==
In 2001, Grandin obtained DNSEP from the College of Fine Arts in Le Mans. He experienced sound as his primary material for work and experimented with it in various forms: video and sound installations in situ, performances, diverted machines, etc. For him the sound, being a noise, music, idea, or material, is a natural energy, message and social claim. Grandin’s approach is supported by concepts of recovery and recycling, be it material or ideological (copyleft, low-tech). His projects go against a fragile idea of art, precious and mercantile, instead they emphasize a ludic and social approach of ideas. He anchors his work in DIY and recovery concepts and confronts his practices in urban spaces. In Douala (Cameroon) he presented Douala Feed Back (2005), Zebu Douala (2007), Le Jardin Sonore de Bonamouti (2010). The latter was also realized in Sao Tome, Nantes and Angers. He also participated in various collaborative projects, such as, Project PUB (Pavilion Urbain de Bonanjo), P.I.A.F, and C.A.I.R.E.

His work has been shown in various exhibitions in France, Portugal, Cameroon, Canada, Mexico, Sao Tome, the USA and in different biennales and triennales. Lucas Grandin is also a co-curator of the exhibition Making Douala presented in Dakar, Rotterdam, Ghent, Nantes, and (in 2017) in Basel.

In 2013, he won the 1st prize of the Audace Artistique (Daring Art), which was awarded by the President of the Republic of France for his project designed together with Jean Moulin school in France, the art centers La Criée and doual'art. In 2014 Le Jardin Sonore de Bonamouti was included in Beaux Arts Magazine. It was also presented in a booklet published by the Tate Modern, Across The Board in the edition of Bozar Brussel, Visionary Urban Africa and DOMUS. In 2015/2016, the city of Angers commissioned a Jardin Sonore for a new district of the city, and was selected for the international exhibition The New Eve in the brickyard of St Brieuc (France).

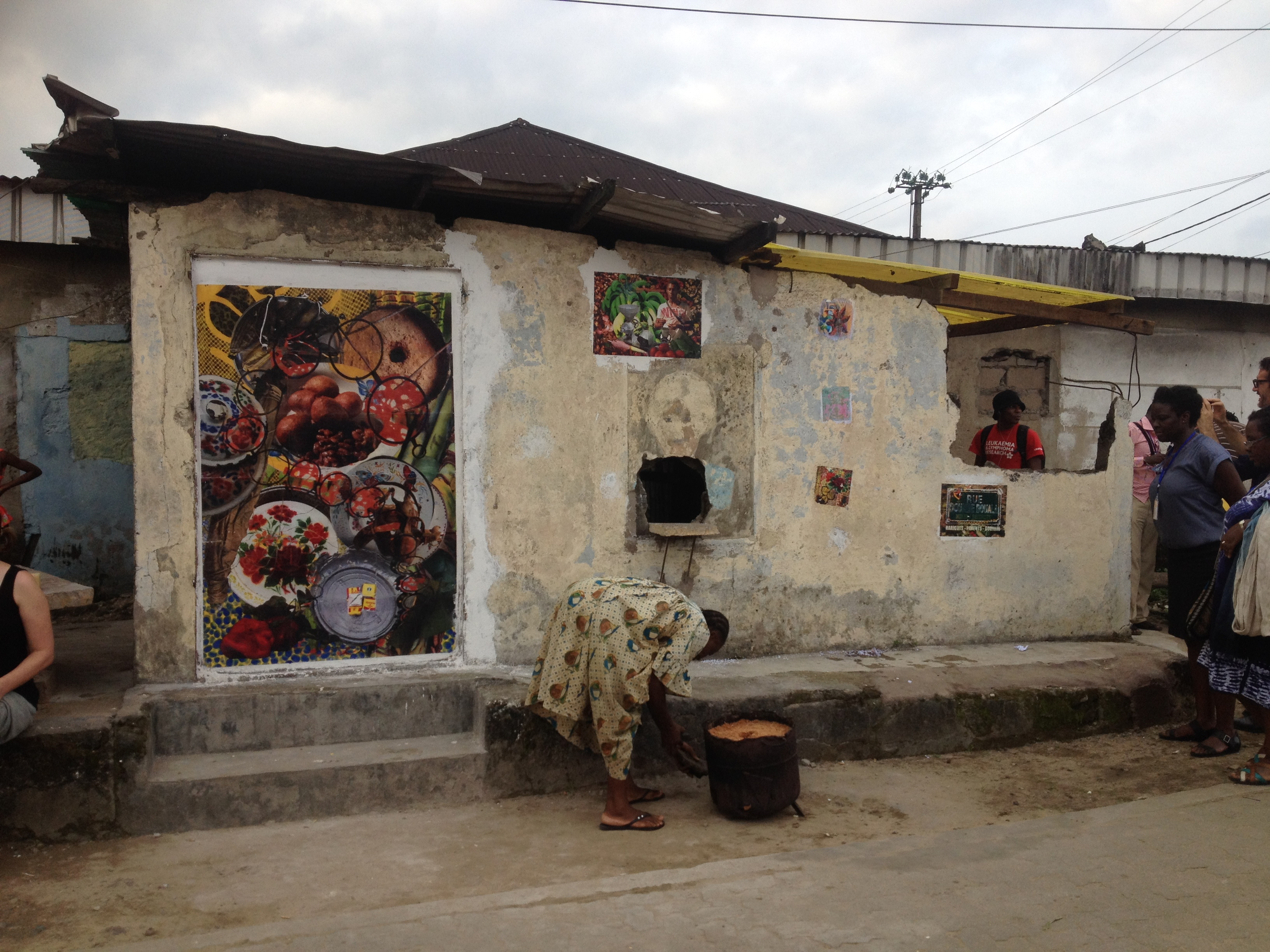
C.A.I.R.E. Bonamouti pendant le SUD Salon Urbain de Douala

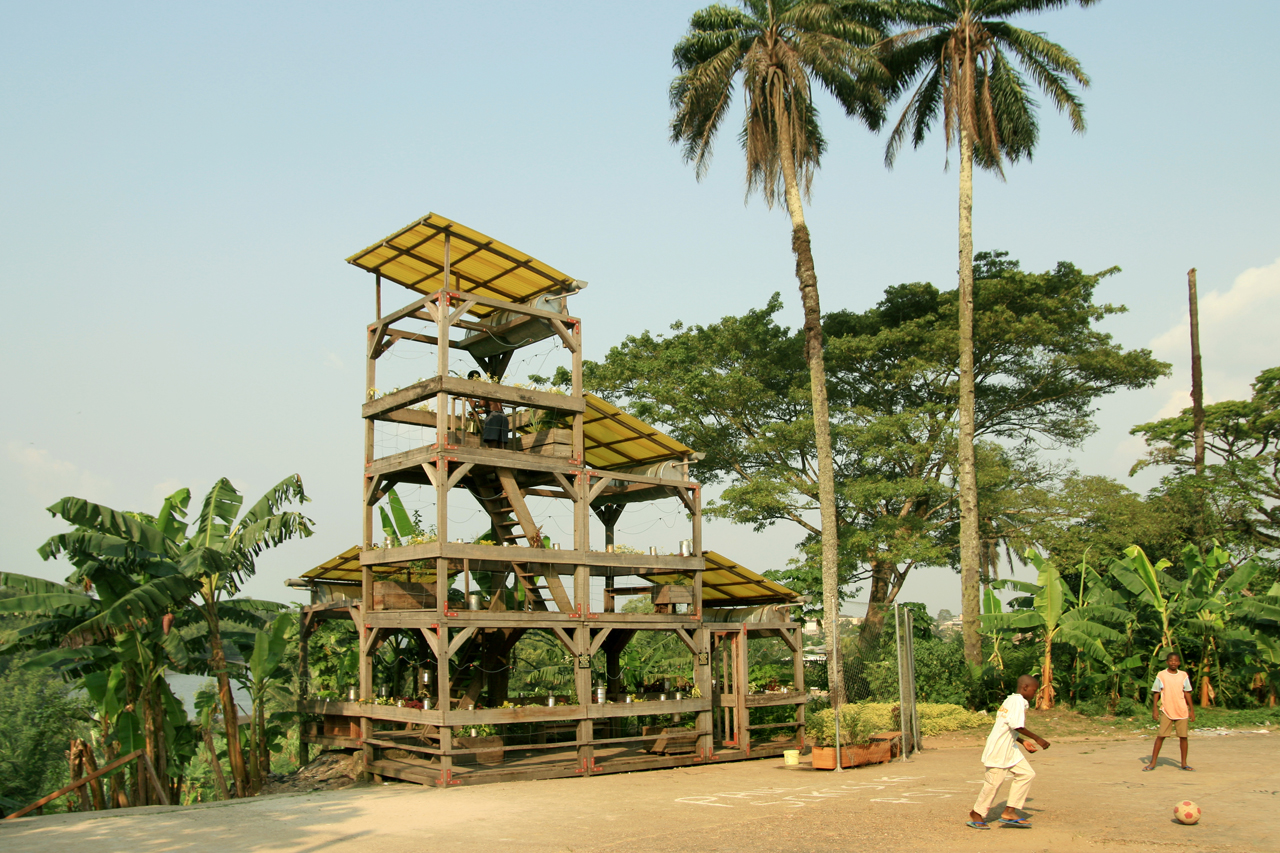
Le Jardin Sonore (vue d'ensemble)

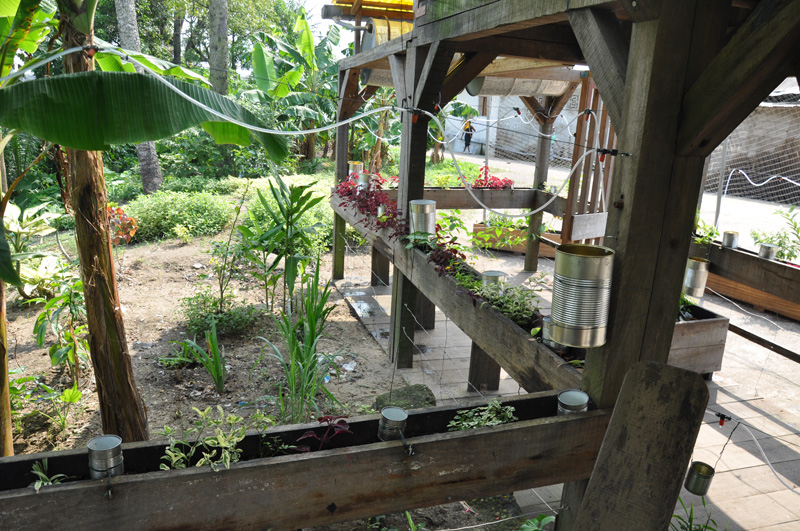
Le Jardin Sonore (détail)

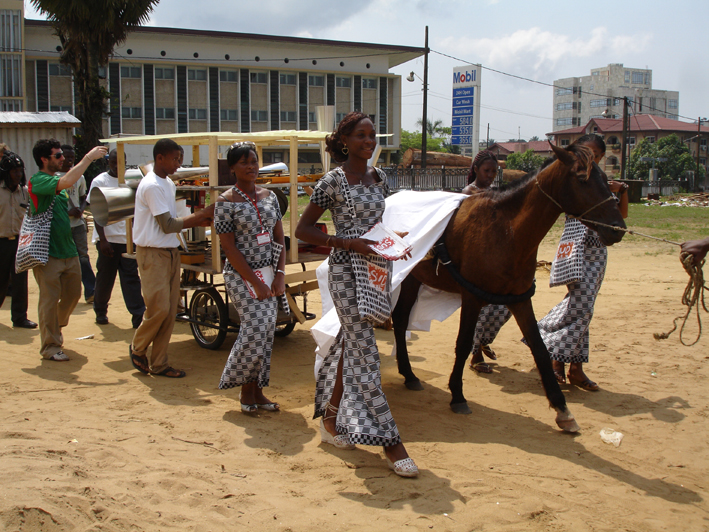
Le Zébu de Douala

== Bibliography ==
- Ouest France (2016). Lucas Grandin au Carrefour des arts. https://www.ouest-france.fr/normandie/manche/lucas-grandin-au-carrefour-des-arts-4157033
- Dailymotion. Symphonie pour 25 Platines : Portrait de Lucas Grandin. https://www.dailymotion.com/video/x24pcc3_symphonie-pour-25-platines-portrait-de-lucas-
- «Ma Cité Idéale » Edition sur les deux ans de résidence à l'école Jean Moulin Rennes/Ecole CBC Babylone Douala. Sortie Novembre 2014. Edition Ville de Rennes/ La Criée. Design François Feutrie.
- Beaux-Arts Magazine L'Art en Vacances...Aout 2014 N° 362 sur Le Jardin Sonore de Bonamouti (SUD 2010, Doual’art), Notre guide des plus beaux voyages Arty…Notre tour du monde en vingt étapes des chefs-d’oeuvre en harmonie avec la nature.
- « Across The Board » Tate Modern/Trust Bank/E.Dyangani Ose
- « M Magazine Le Monde N°21276 » Bouffée d'Art en ZEP F.Berteau 14.06.13
- « Catalogue du prix de l'audace artistique et culturelle » Edition de la Présidence de la République Française/Ministère de l'Éducation/Ministère de la Culture/ F. Culture et Diversité/réal. E.Bouttier/Dic/MMC/Graph Michelon
- Pensa, Iolanda (Ed.) 2017. Public Art in Africa. Art et transformations urbaines à Douala /// Art and Urban Transformations in Douala. Genève: Metis Presses. ISBN 978-2-94-0563-16-6

=== Related articles ===
- List of public art in Douala
- Le Jardin Sonore de Bonamouti
