= Soldat (video game) =

2D multiplayer video game

- Original author: Michał Marcinkowski
- Developers: Transhuman Design: Paweł Drzazga; Mariano Cuatrin; Nick Cooper; Tomasz Kołosowski; Chris GreenBank; Daniel Forssten; Gregor A. Cieslak; Jacob Lindberg; Joe Gillotti; Michael Himing; Maciek Mighty; Oliver Kuckertz; Reko Tiira; Tony Libell; Umut Karakas; Tomasz Kołosowski
- Initial release: 23 August 2002; 23 years ago
- Stable release: 1.7.1.1 / 25 May 2020; 5 years ago
- Written in: Pascal
- Middleware: SDL; OpenAL; FreeType
- Operating system: Microsoft Windows
- Type: Run and gun
- License: MIT License (code); CC BY 4.0 (assets)
- Website: www.soldat.pl/en/
- Repository: github.com/Soldat/soldat github.com/Soldat/base

Soldat is a 2D multiplayer video game for Microsoft Windows. It is a run and gun game influenced by Liero and Scorched Earth, combined with elements from Counter-Strike and Worms.

== Development history ==
Soldat was initially developed by Michał Marcinkowski (MM) beginning in November 2001. MM is CEO of the independent game development group Transhuman Design and is also known for his work on games such as Crimson Glory, R & link-dead. The game is coded in the Delphi programming language using the JEDI libraries. The first public beta (v0.9.4b) was released on 9 May 2002. As time passed, the game changed from being developed exclusively by MM, to having many different developers that contribute in different ways, with MM still making the executive decisions for Soldat.

Soldat's head developer changed over time: Michał "MM" Marcinkowski led the project until 2008, followed until 2010 by Nick "EnEsCe" Cooper. Gregor "Shoozza" A. Cieslak led the project from 2010 to 2016. Between 2016 and 2017, Tomasz "Falcon" Kołosowski was the project lead, followed again by Gregor "Shoooza" A. Cieslak.

Released on August 23, 2002, version 1.0.5b is considered the first major release of the game, though several betas and minor versions were available in the months preceding its release. Since then, the game has gone through many changes and additions. Weapon balance is often a main focus of new releases. The significant release changes were "startup" modifications in the M82A1 Barrett, M72 LAW, and Combat Knife, as well as minor bugs with flags and maps.

1.4.2 added many major features. These included a completely new lobby system to replace the aged and unreliable original system (see the forums for problems), an option (registered only) to scale the resolution interface for a cleaner view, a minimap (registered only), BattlEye (an anti-cheat system), and many bug fixes. 1.4.0 was originally intended only as a bug-fixed version 1.3.2, but it was bumped up to 1.4.0 due to the addition of the many new features.

1.5.0 is the first release to be handled using public beta testing. In addition to a long list of bug fixes, major new features in this version include in-game radio commands, TeamSpeak2 integration and animated GIF scenery.

Version 1.6.0 released more than two years after 1.5.0; it focuses primarily on bug fixes. It also adds a new anti-cheat solution, new maps, support for widescreen resolutions, the ability to ban by hardware ID and many in-game improvements.

1.7.0 introduced some bigger changes: It included a new OpenGL-based renderer with improved performance and major graphical updates.

Released in January 2016, 1.7.1 is the latest version of the game. It brought 4K UHD quality to the player models and to more scenery. As well as weapon mod changes and addition of Hitbox Modifiers for the head, chest and legs.

By April 2018, the goal was to release the next version on Steam. An open-source version of the game was announced for 2018 after the Steam release, following a successful change.org petition.

Two years later, on March 31, 2020, Soldat 1.7.1 was released on Steam—even though official date on Steam Store page was on April 1. During its first hours on Steam, Soldat hit close to 400 active players at the same time, getting over 130 user reviews with a general score of "Very Positive".

On May 26, 2020, the source code of an unfinished future version 1.8 of Soldat was released under MIT license on GitHub. The assets followed shortly after under a Creative Commons license, the CC BY 4.0.

On September 22, 2020, a sequel, Soldat 2, was released in Early Access on Steam.

== Gameplay ==
In Soldat, the player controls a small customizable soldier who possesses jet boots. These boots allow the soldier to fly for a relatively short time, before needing to automatically regenerate their fuel. The amount of flying possible at a time, and fuel regeneration rate, both depend on individual maps. The game is normally played over the Internet or a LAN, but it is possible to play offline against bots. There are a variety of game modes to choose from, ranging from the popular free-for-all (Deathmatch, Rambomatch, and Pointmatch) to the team-based (Capture the Flag; Infiltration, Teammatch, and Hold the Flag). In some modes holding or defending a flag is the primary goal, where in others it is simply to obtain the most frags, with minor objectives (for example, Pointmatch sports a yellow flag which doubles its bearer's points). The most popular game modes are Capture the Flag and Deathmatch.

For all game modes, the basic objective is to kill enemy players. Upon spawning, the weapons menu is displayed and the player may pick from an arsenal of weapons. Frag grenades are also supplied by default and more can picked up from boxes laying around the maps ("Grenade Kit" or "Nade Kit" respectively). Jet boots are used to move around the maps, which typically consists of 2-3 levels/floors, or disorganized, floating boulders. Some servers enable temporary-lasting power-ups that grant multiplied damage (Berserker), invisibility (Predator mode), a flamethrower along with temporary invincibility (FlameGod), or Cluster Grenades (which temporarily replace regular grenades with three of more powerful, modified versions) or even a Bulletproof Vest (effectiveness of the vest depends on the distance from the firer of the bullet, and the vest slowly decreases as it soaks up damage, disappearing after absorbing a certain amount of damage, though there is no time limit). Health crates (known in the game as "Medikits") are available in many locations for healing injury back to 100% no matter how much a player is injured. Upon death and after waiting for a server-specified amount of time (on average 5 seconds), players re-spawn and may choose another weapon—this cycle repeats for the duration of the map, unless Survival Mode is enabled (in which case a spawning system similar to Counter-Strike is used). After a certain allotted time (on average 15 or 20 minutes), the map changes and scores are reset as players continue in another round. Players can chat with each other throughout matches (and to their own teams, for cooperative team-based game modes).

Most games are fast-paced and chaotic. Bodies often explode in a spectacle of blood and body parts, sometimes being hurled clear across the map. Besides its ragdoll physics, the game's engine, written in the Borland Delphi programming language, employs realistic concepts such as momentum and gravity. Fall damage and recoil are also taken into account when Realistic Mode is enabled, and supply crates, dropped weapons, and grenades realistically tumble down steep hills; another effect is the flag's realistic waving as a player runs with it.

=== Weapons ===
There are ten primary weapons and four secondary weapons to choose from. A total of any two weapons may be held at any given time. Players can drop their current weapon and pick up others from defeated enemies. It is also possible to create server-specific weapon mods. The choice of weapon is largely dependent on the type of map, preferred tactics and weapons choice of the players' enemies.

Soldat aims to create balance between all of the weapons (also known as Weapon Mod), in order to make all weapons viable. A lot of tweaking was done (and is done until today) in order to achieve this goal. The matter of the weapon mod is quite controversial. This has led to the existence of an entire section of the official community message board devoted to discussion about the weapons' game balance.

=== Bunny hopping ===
Soldat is one of many games in which bunny hopping is possible. Players can travel much faster via frequent leaping, rather than ordinary running, and often players who do not bunny hop are left behind. However, even when bunny hopping, a basic maximum speed limits horizontal movement. In addition, leaping before thrusting substantially boosts horizontal movement, as the leap gives horizontal push while the jet boots must only manage the player's vertical ascent.

=== Maps ===
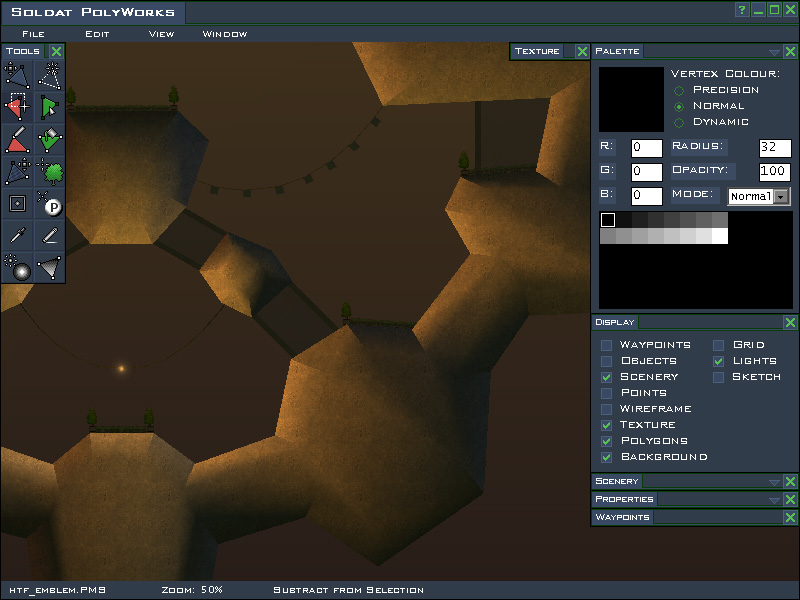
Screenshot of the map editor Soldat PolyWorks (version 1.4.0.4) using to create map for Soldat. We can see a crop of the edition of the map htf emblem

Maps in Soldat are 2D arenas, most being tailored to fast-paced game-play. Deathmatch maps are shared with Pointmatch (PM), Rambomatch (RM), and Teammatch (TM or TDM, for Team Deathmatch) gamemodes, whereas Capture-the-Flag (CTF), Infiltration (INF) and Hold-the-Flag (HTF) have their own sets of specialized maps. There are currently 97 default maps in the game for the different game modes.

Every map consists of numerous textured polygons carefully positioned in relation to one another. Unlike Liero, a major inspiration of Soldat, landscape is non-deformable, though it can be interacted with in other ways. Scenery, such as bushes and sandbags, may conceal players and aid in camping and sniping. Polygons can be given special attributes to simulate lethal death pits, icy terrain, health-regenerative platforms, and more. Weather effects (snow, rain, and sandstorm) are used on some maps. Some servers enable the powerful stationary M2 turret specified by particular maps (usually CTF and INF) which players can man.

There are several known programs for mapping. The original map editor program is MapMaker 1.2, by Michał Marcinkowski himself. It has a unique control scheme that includes using the right mouse button to navigate the map and the control, shift, and alt keys combined with the left or right mouse button to perform functions. Another popular Soldat mapping program is PolyWorks, which has a different control scheme and a much more complex interface.

== Community ==
The new lobby server indicates it holds a record number of lobby requests at 71,459 per day. A complete list of total players has not been counted, but the official Soldat forums have over 12,000 registered members. Map editors are also available. Many Soldat players have developed and distributed their own programs for use with the game. These include, but are not limited to, map editors, weapon editors, statistics programs, mods, server-side statistical webpage plugins (such as U13SSS and Zitro-stats), and auto-join applications. There are many fan web pages serving a multitude of purposes and tastes, mainly different clans for the official tournaments the game's community sponsors.

== Sub gamemodes ==
=== Realistic Mode ===
As the Soldat community has grown, so has the popularity of the sub gamemode Realistic (often abbreviated "R" or "R-mode"). Realistic makes the game have more realistic characteristics to it; the weapons are more powerful and they have recoil (the crosshair moves upwards with each successive shot), there is a realistic field of view, and players sustain greater damage when they hit the ground at high speeds. This mode emphasizes the need for proper tactics more strongly than the standard game mode, sometimes regarded as requiring more skill.

=== Survival Mode ===
All players spawn together at the beginning. Once players die, they must wait until the round is decided, then every player spawns again to start the next round. This game mode also provides a break from the normal non-stop action and more intensive battles.

In most realistic servers, survival mode is also activated. These servers are referred to as Realistic-Survival (R/S) servers. R/S mode games usually consist of short length battles between two sides in Capture the Flag mode.

Around the time of Soldat v1.3.1, most R/S matches developed a certain "gentlemen's rule" that a player should not capture the flag unless the opposing team is defeated. Because this is an unwritten rule, it is confusing to most people new to R/S servers. "Capping" or "Running" in an R/S server is usually considered bad etiquette, because it effectively defeats the other team without having to kill them. In more popular servers ran by R/S clans, capturing the flag is a legitimate tactic, as the game mode is still "Capture the Flag", not "Team Deathmatch", which only involves eradicating the enemy team. On the other hand, killing the other team and capping the flag in the few seconds remaining before the round ends, is called a doublecap, earns the team 2 points instead of the normal single point and is accepted in most servers, although many have implemented anti-doublecap scripts to prevent it.

=== Advance Mode ===
In Advance mode players start the match armed only with secondary weapons. Primary guns are progressively unlocked as a reward for frags. With its forced low-tech phase and limited weapon choices, advance mode is the often considered the most tactical Soldat mode.

Any of these sub-game modes may be combined with the other game modes, or it can be active by itself.

== Reception ==
Eurogamer's Jim Rossignol named Soldat among a top 20 list of Summer of PC freeware games in 2006. Thinkdigit included it July 2008 in its cover disk.

Its re-release on Steam on March 31, 2020, scored a general Very Positive over 130 user reviews. During its first hours on Steam, Soldat hit close to 400 active players at the same time.
