= All rights reversed =

Pun indicating copyleft licensing status

The copyleft symbol, defined as U+1F12F in Unicode. Unlike the copyright symbol, it has no legal meaning.

All rights reversed is a phrase that indicates a release of a publication under a copyleft license. It is a pun on the common copyright disclaimer "All rights reserved", a copyright formality originally required by the Buenos Aires Convention of 1910. However, computer scientist and lawyer Arnoud Engelfriet writes that "[t]he phrase ['All rights reversed'] by itself is not enough; a license must explicitly state the rights that are granted".

In 1984 or 1985, programmer Don Hopkins sent Richard Stallman a letter labeled "Copyleft—all rights reversed". Stallman chose the phrase to identify his free software method of distribution. It is often accompanied by a reversed version of the copyright symbol. That said, the use of the reversed copyright symbol is considered legally risky by the Free Software Foundation.
