= Fair License =

Minimalistic permissive free software license

- Author: James William Pye
- Published: 2004
- SPDX identifier: Fair
- OSI approved: Yes
- GPL compatible: Yes
- Copyleft: No
- Linking from code with a different license: Yes
- Website: https://opensource.org/license/fair/

The Fair License is a short, simple and permissive free software licence. Its text is composed of only one sentence and a disclaimer, thus being the shortest license ever approved by the Open Source Initiative. It is also possible to use the Fair License for images, books, music or more generally all kinds of media. The text of the license is as follows:

<Copyright Information>

Usage of the works is permitted provided that this instrument is retained with the works, so that any entity that uses the works is notified of this instrument.

DISCLAIMER: THE WORKS ARE WITHOUT WARRANTY.

More popular alternatives to the Fair License are the MIT and simplified BSD licenses, which are also composed of few sentences but their disclaimers are longer.

== History ==
The author, James William Pye, submitted the license for approval in January 2004. During the approval process, James answered some questions as quoted below and proposed a draft version:

. Tell us which existing OSI-approved license is most similar
. to your license. [...]

The license is similar to the BSD license.
The BSD license seems to imply a requirement of, what I call, Due Credit. Although, I wanted an explicit specification of Due Credit within my license. I also thought it more appropriate to use terms such as 'works' instead of 'source' to not be specific as to what was covered by the license within the license(Would this matter in a trial?).
The Fair License is mainly a generalized BSD license(terminology-wise) with an explicit requirement of Due Credit by the retention and notification of the instrument.


. Explain how software distributed under your license can be
. used in conjunction with software distributed under other
. open source licenses.

Simply by retaining the license with the works that are covered by the license.


. Which license do you think will take
. precedence for derivative or combined works?

I assume this is heavily dependent on the other license and perhaps even the works in question, but I am sure most other licenses would take precedence considering Fair's easy nature.

[...]

Utilization is defined as Any usage, transmission, distribution,
publication, or mutation of the works, regardless of form.

Due Credit is defined as The mere acknowledgment of the affinity
between the owner and the works thereof.

Utilization of the works protected by this instrument is
permitted provided that the copyright owner receives Due Credit
by meeting the following requirement:

This instrument must be retained with the works, regardless of
form; so that any entity that exercises direct or indirect
utilization of the works be notified of and understand all the
information specified within this instrument and be required to
accept and understand the terms of this license.

THE WORKS ARE PROVIDED BY THE OWNER "AS IS"; THUS ANY EXPRESSED
OR IMPLIED WARRANTIES OR LIABILITIES FOR DAMAGES CAUSED BY THE
WORKS ARE WHOLLY DISCLAIMED.

— James William Pye, For Approval: Fair License, https://lists.opensource.org/pipermail/license-discuss_lists.opensource.org/2004-January/007573.html

Three days later, the almost-final version was defined as such:

Alteration to the license

. Remove superfluous definitions.
. Shorten the disclaimer
    I don't think it is necessary to elaborate on the disclamation of warranty.
. Imply Due Credit(attribution) like the BSD License.
. Remove explicit license acceptance/understanding requirement in the latter part of the permission requirement.
    I think this is a well established implication within any license.

	This is a pretty significant change, but I just want the meat and potatoes, so I got rid of the fluff.

	The copyright and other identification information should be prepended to the license, which should be considered part of the instrument.

---LICENSE---
<Copyright Information>

Utilization of the works is permitted provided that this
instrument is retained with the works, so that any entity
that utilizes the works is notified of this instrument.

DISCLAIMER: THE WORKS ARE WITHOUT WARRANTY.

[2004, Fair License: rhid.com/fair]
---LICENSE---

This shortens it up pretty well, but I think it is still effective.

Any comments are welcome.

Regards,
        James William Pye

— James William Pye, For Approval: Fair License, https://lists.opensource.org/pipermail/license-discuss_lists.opensource.org/2004-January/007622.html

One year later, James William Pye summarized his motivation as such:

The purpose of the license is to create a concise gift license. It
contrasts from BSD and MIT and most other gift licenses by being
"open-ended", rather than closed. That difference being that BSD and MIT
specifically state the exercisable rights, whereas this license
authorizes all the rights granted by authorship(all inclusive).

Without disclaimers, it has about half the number of words that MIT has.
With disclaimers, it is significantly shorter. So despite the expansion,
it still appears to be the shortest license out there. ;)

— James William Pye, For thoughts: fair license, https://lists.debian.org/debian-legal/2005/05/msg00013.html

== Translations ==
In 2007, Open Source Group Japan published a Japanese translation as such:

<著作権情報>

本成果物は、本契約書が成果物に保持され、これにより本成果物を使用する者すべてに本契約書が示されることを条件に、使用が許可されます。

免責条項： 本成果物の保証は一切ありません。 

In 2013 users on the French Language Stack Exchange proposed a French translation as such:

<Information des droits d'auteur>

Les œuvres peuvent être réutilisées à condition d'être accompagnées du texte de cette licence, afin que tout utilisateur en soit informé.

AVERTISSEMENT : LES ŒUVRES N'ONT AUCUNE GARANTIE.

== See also ==
- Comparison of free and open-source software licenses
