= Le Jardin sonore =

Public artwork in Douala, Cameroon

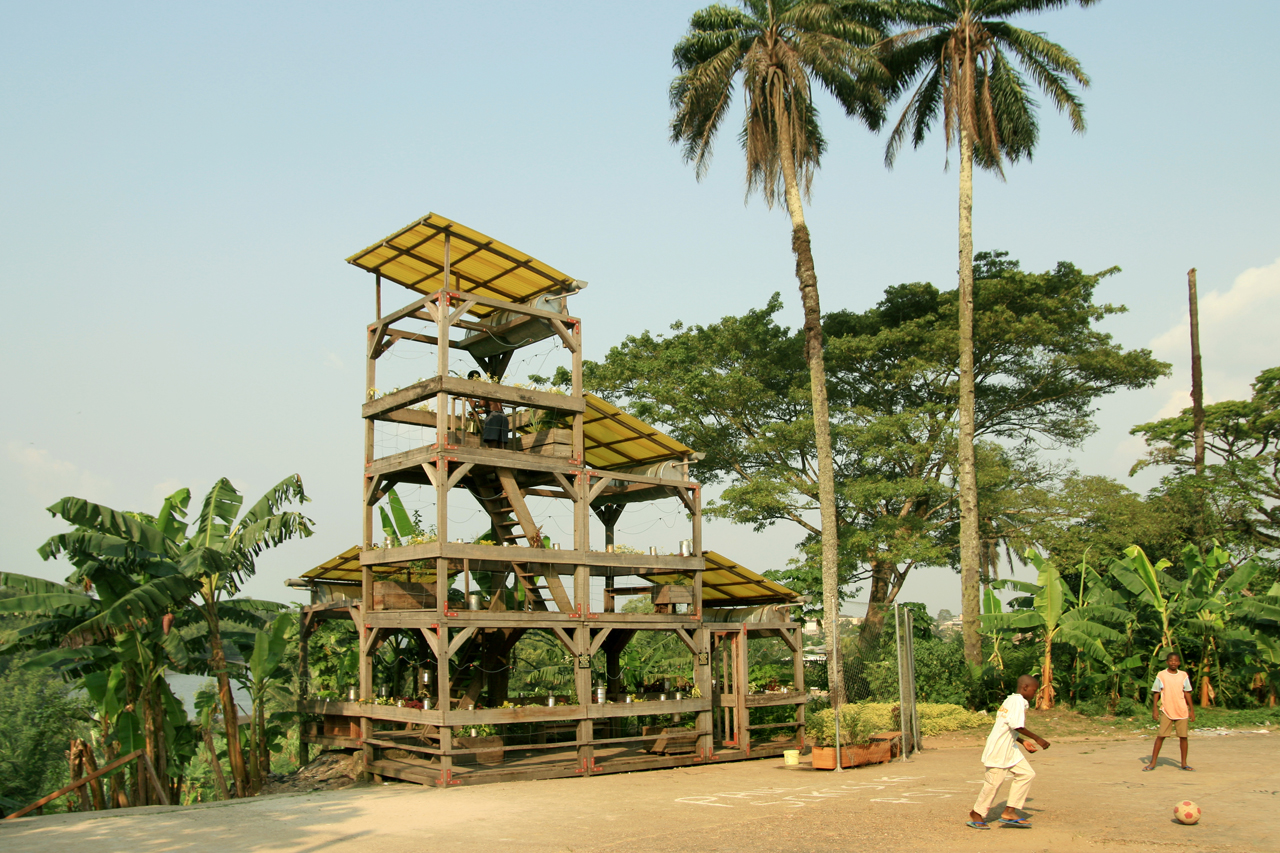
- Artist: Lucas Grandin
- Year: 2010
- Dimensions: 10 m × 4,52 m × 6,83 m (390 in × 17,800 in × 26,900 in)
- Location: Bonamouti-Deido, near Wouri River. Douala, Cameroon; 4.0943°N 9.8151°E
- Owner: Municipality of Douala

Le Jardin sonore is a permanent public artwork located in Douala (Cameroon). It was created by Lucas Grandin in 2010 and is made of a wooden structure built on three floors that serves as a panoramic viewpoint on the Wouri River, as a botanical garden and as a dewdrop percussion organ.

== The artwork ==
Le Jardin sonore est d'une hauteur de 10 mètres, longueur de 6,83 mètres, une largeur maximale de 4,52 mètres. Sa superficie totale est de 35 mètre carrés d’espace repartis sur trois niveaux (Rez de chaussée 20 m2, 1er étage 10m2 et 2ième étage 5m2) Il fut inauguré pendant le SUD - Salon Urbain de Douala 2010.

In February 2010, Lucas Grandin started working at his Jardin Sonore, a wooden structure built on three floors that serves as a panoramic viewpoint on the Wouri River, as a botanical garden and as a dewdrop percussion organ. Lucas Grandin's work aroused the passionate interest of the inhabitants of the district, creating a place for socializing and contemplation and covering the urban cacophony inside its water walls. During SUD 2010, the artist engaged the inhabitants of Bonamouti in the production process of the work though preparatory meetings, the requalification of the area (used before as dumpster on the edge of the river), and the building structure.

The botanical garden, located on the perimeter of the wooden structure, hosts flowering, cosmetics, grocery and light pharmaceutical plants. The Jardin Sonore is equipped with a sustainable "drop by drop" irrigation system, which allows reaching water autonomy up to 6 months. The water is collected by the rainfall, stocked in barrels and offered to the vertical garden through transparent tubes using a hydroponic dripping system. This system does not allow for water dispersion and, at the same time, it does not require regular watering from inhabitants.

Drops of water drip into cans of different sizes, creating notes and feeding plants for the neighborhood of Bonamouti. Different kinds of sound are directly conducted by the plants different needs of water. This elevated garden growing at the sound of the water and invites the public to contemplate at the river Wouri from each of its three levels.

This building is a water sound garden, to gain conscience of the importance of the water in our life, to give Douala its right to the water back and to show its origins, to give a free new social meeting place in Bonamouti where everybody can go when he wants to have some rest with the water melody, to smell of the flowers, to see the Wouri river and its original mangrove (where everybody came) and feel the wind of the nature... a new social area to talk, to plant, to listen, to re-create a new inter-generational communication through the garden. The Jardin Sonore has also become a romantic area for young lovers, who meet on the upper floors to contemplate the river view.

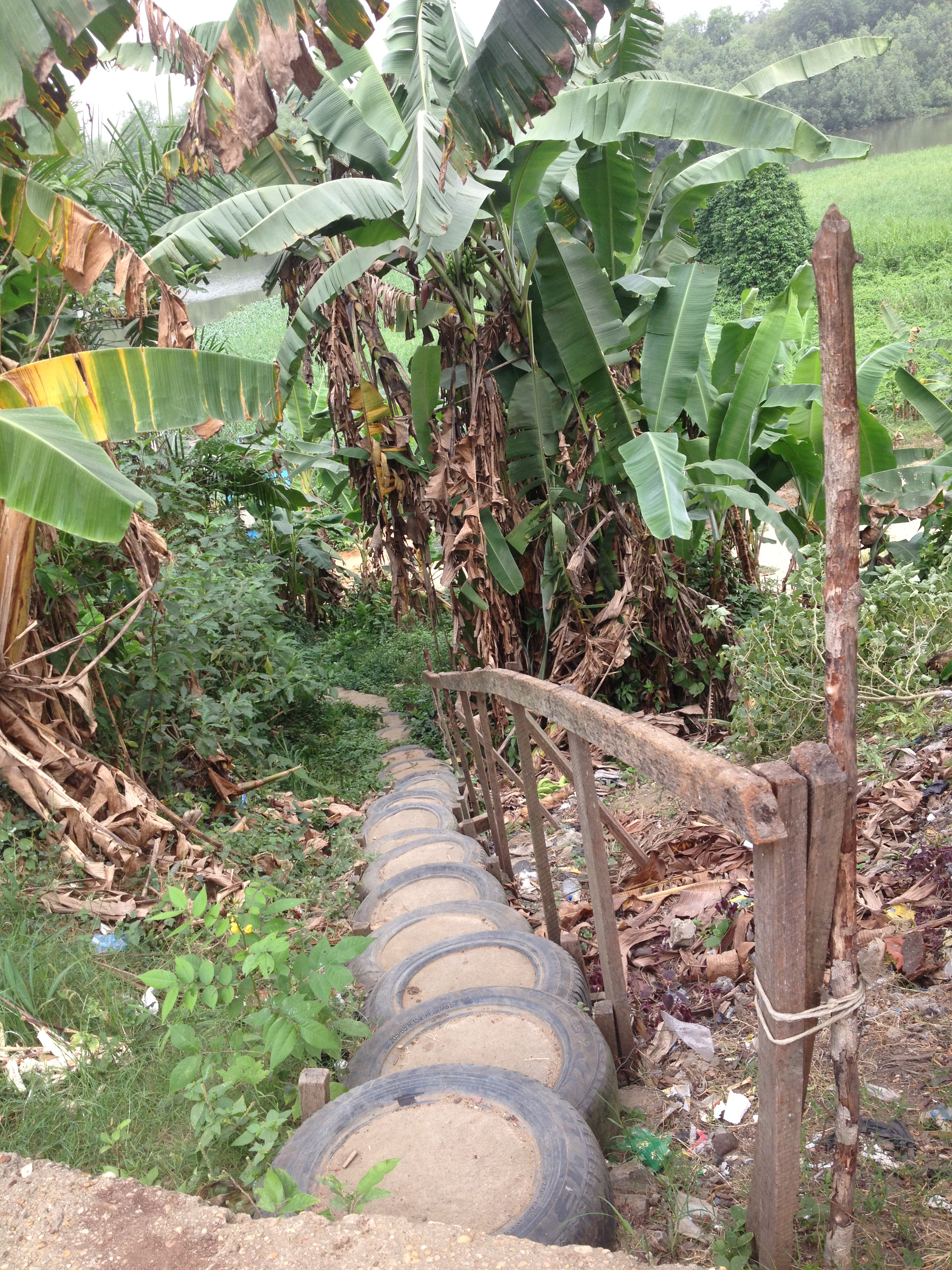

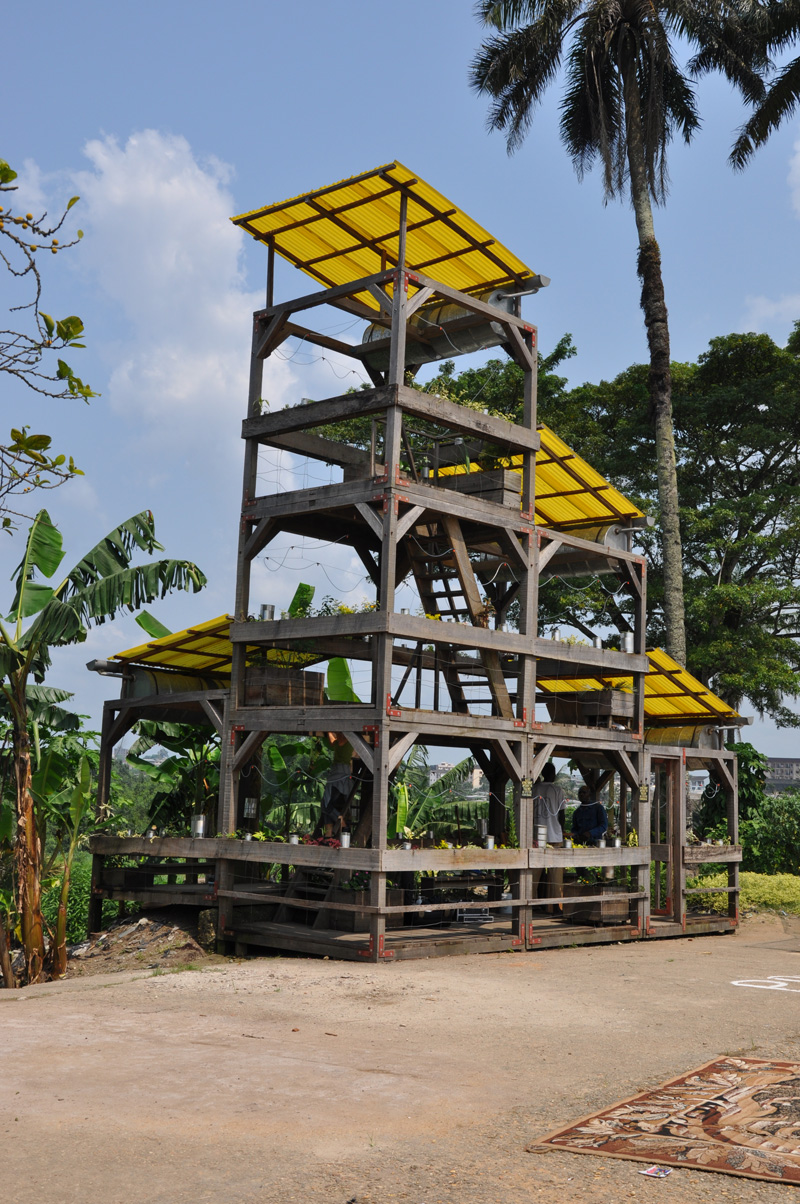

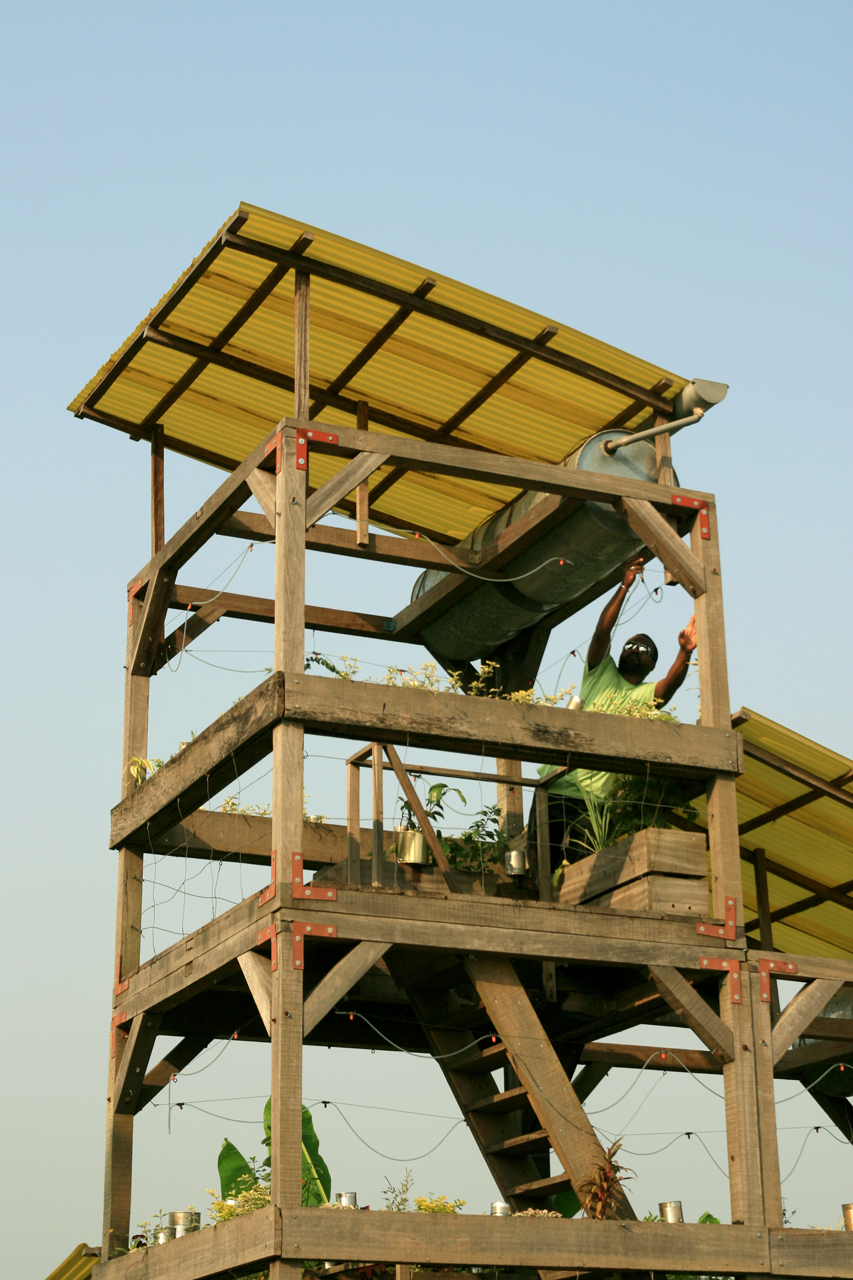

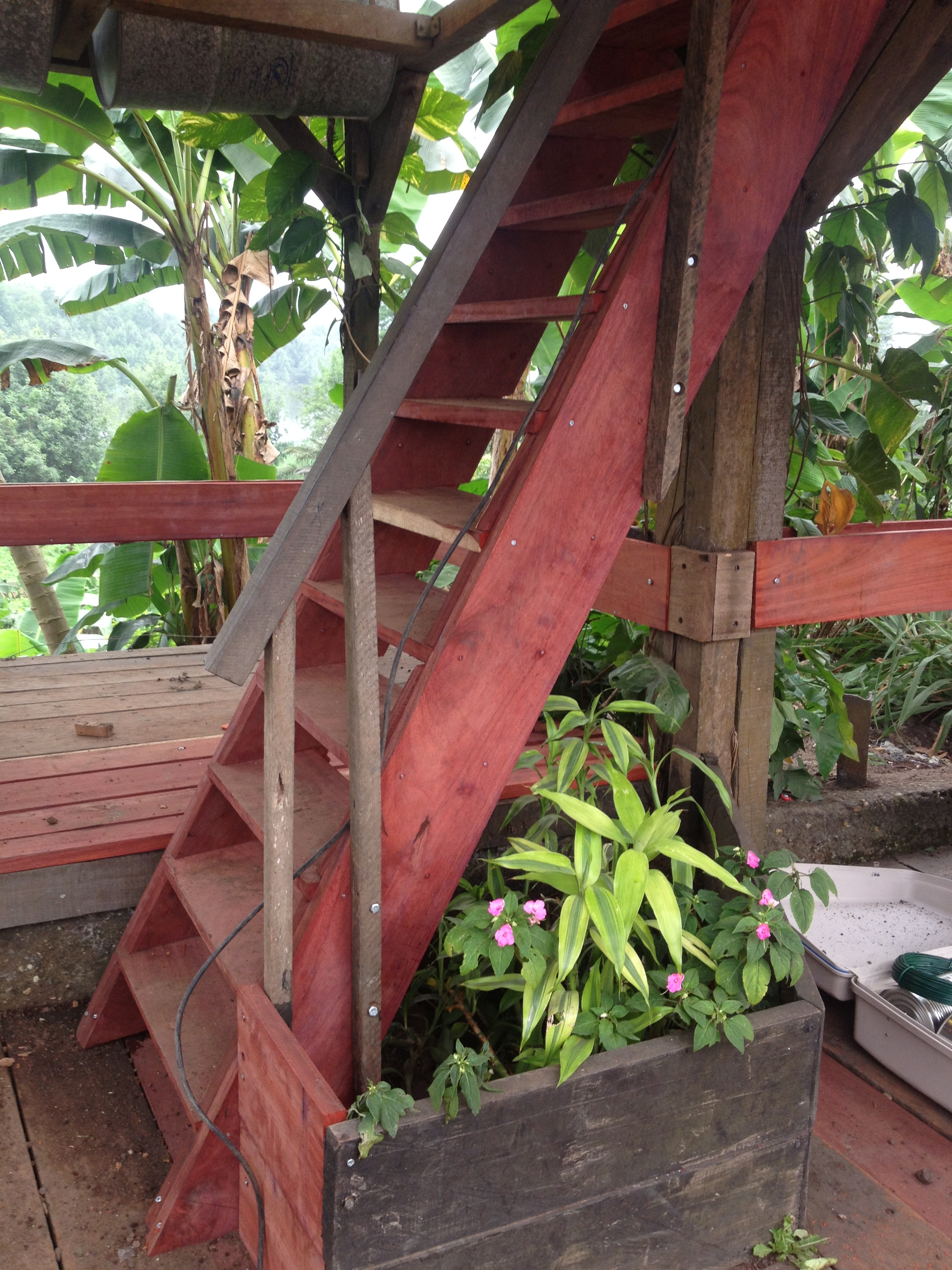

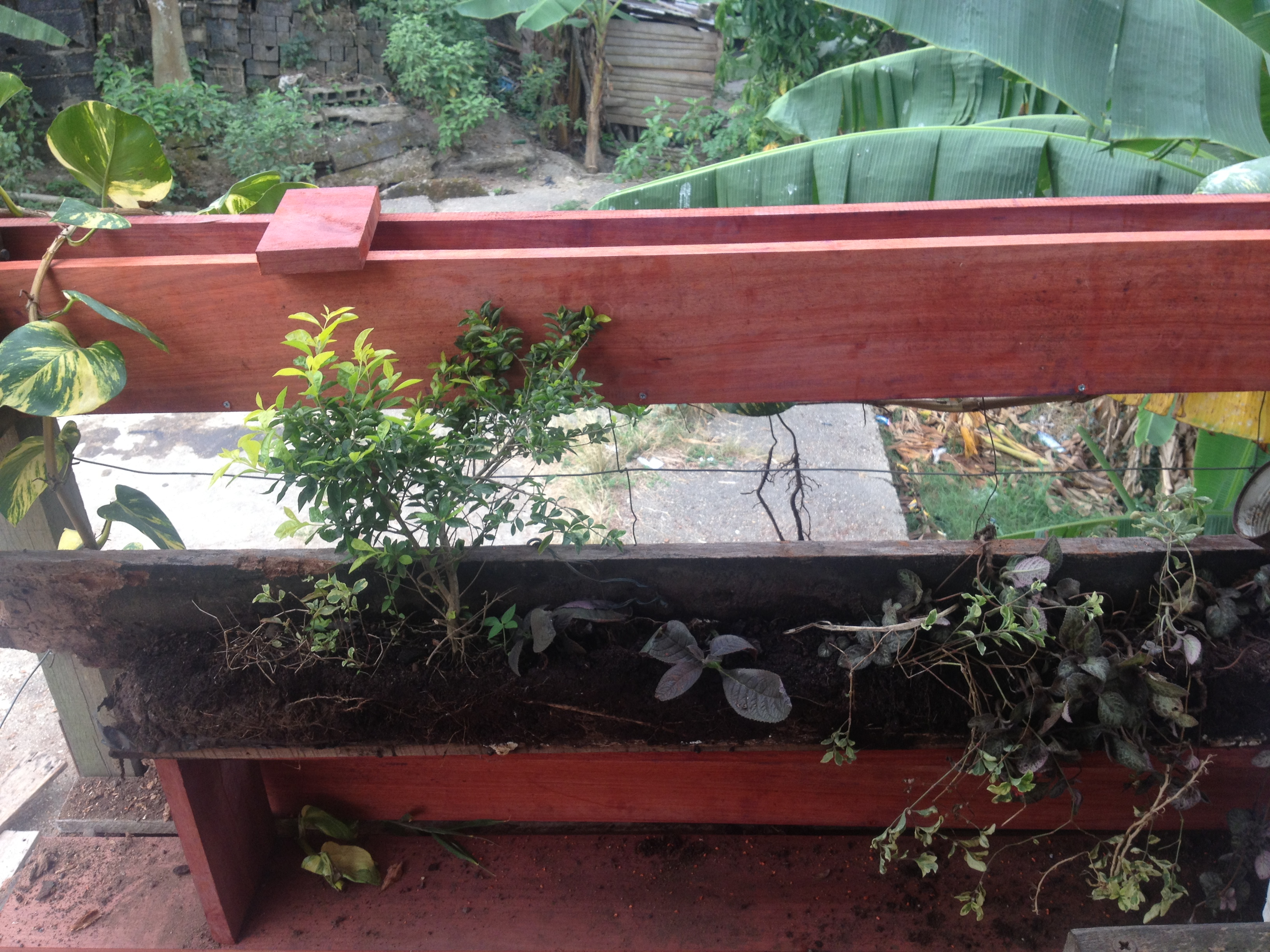

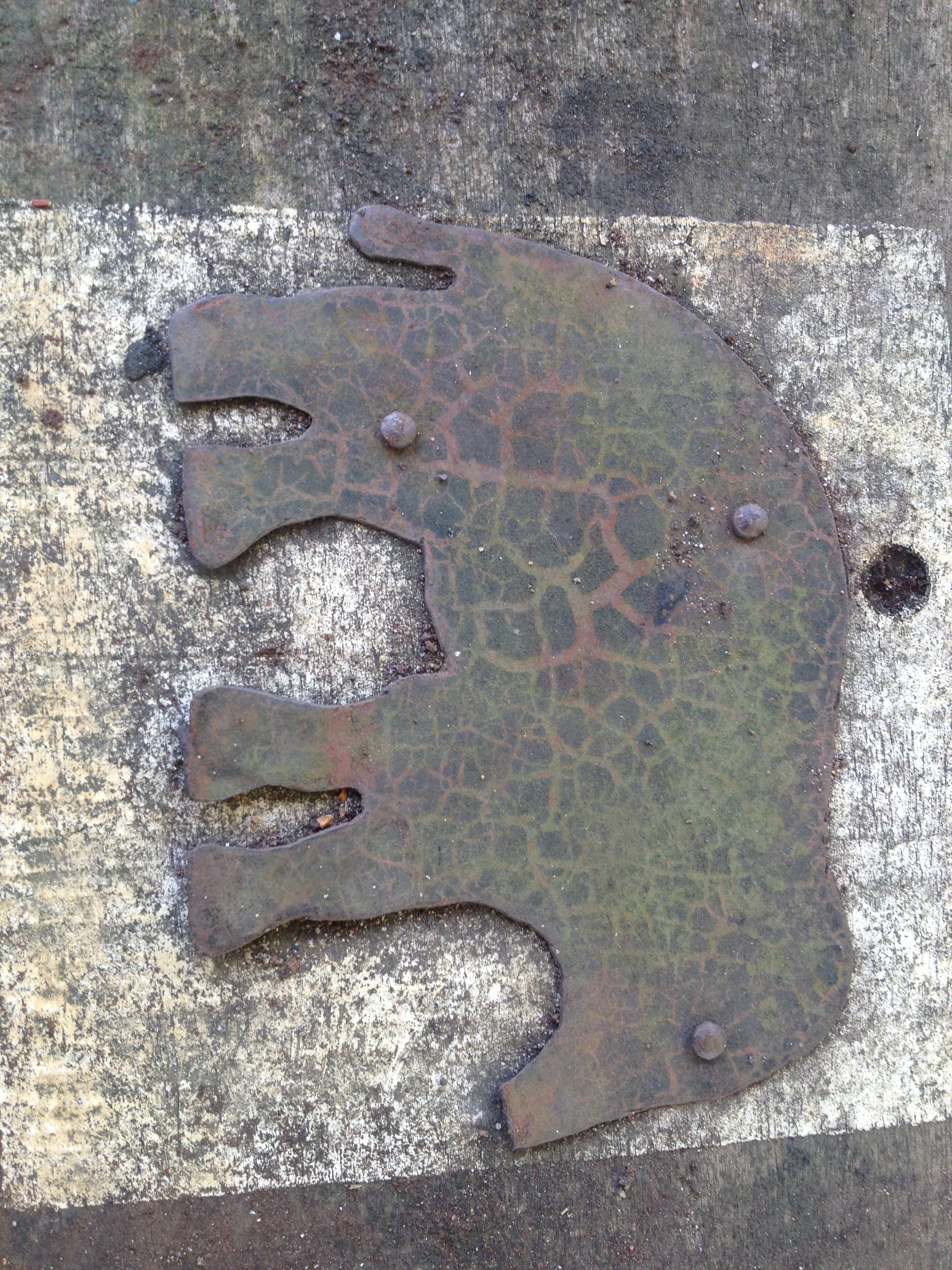

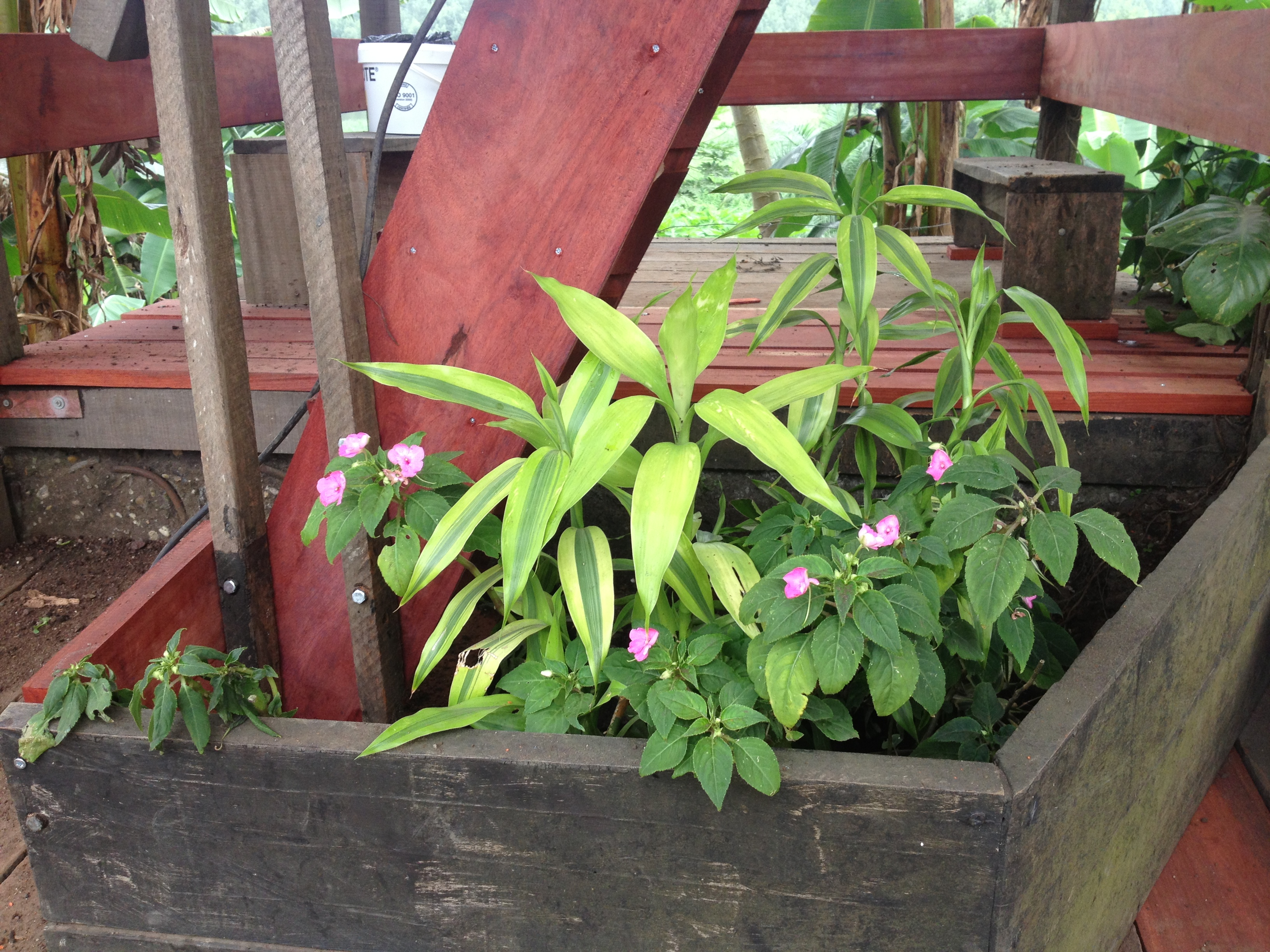

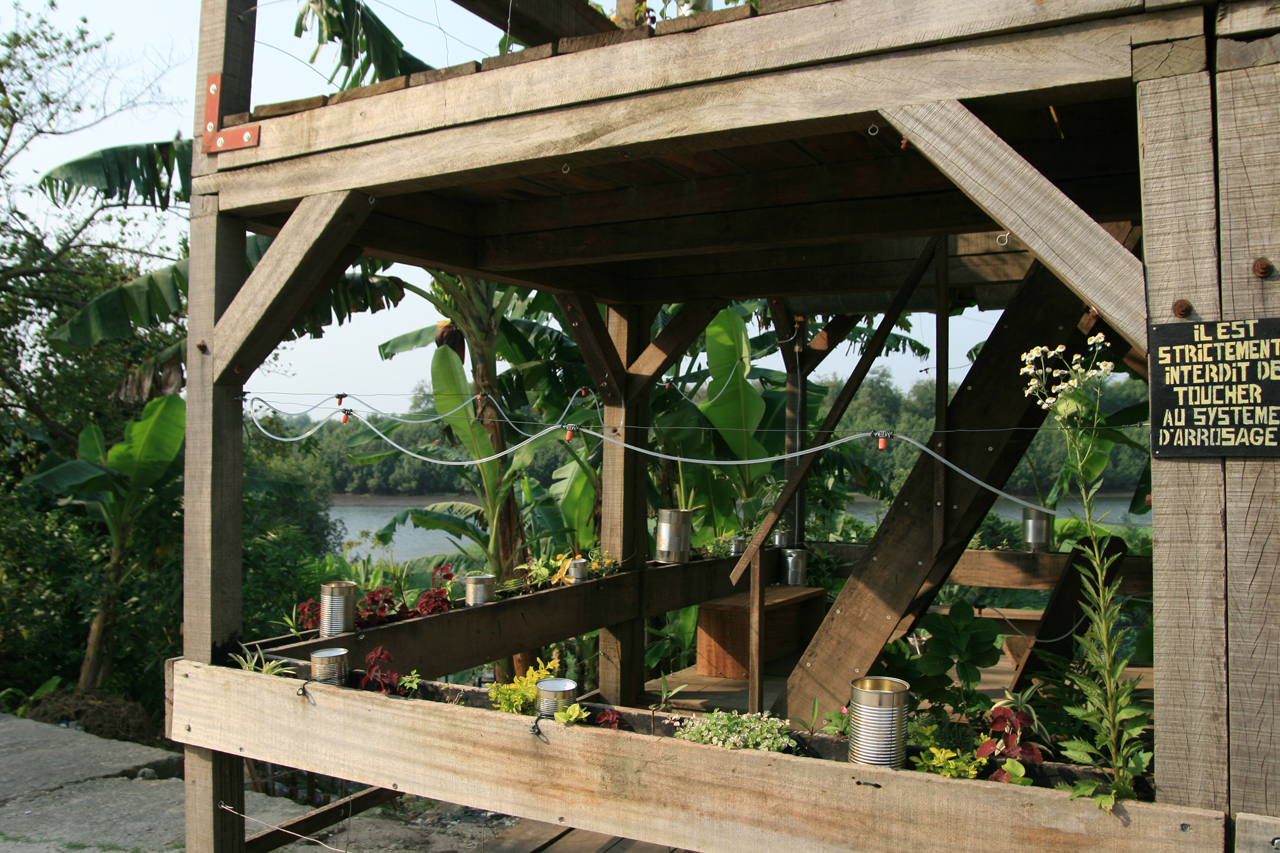

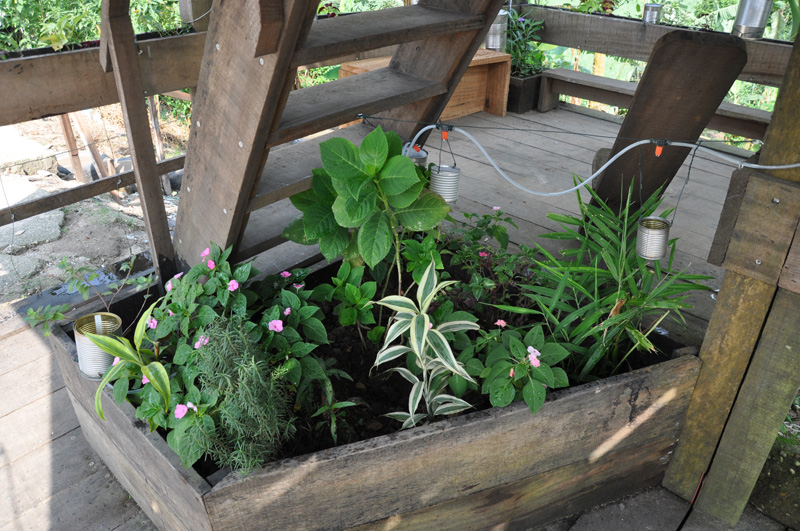

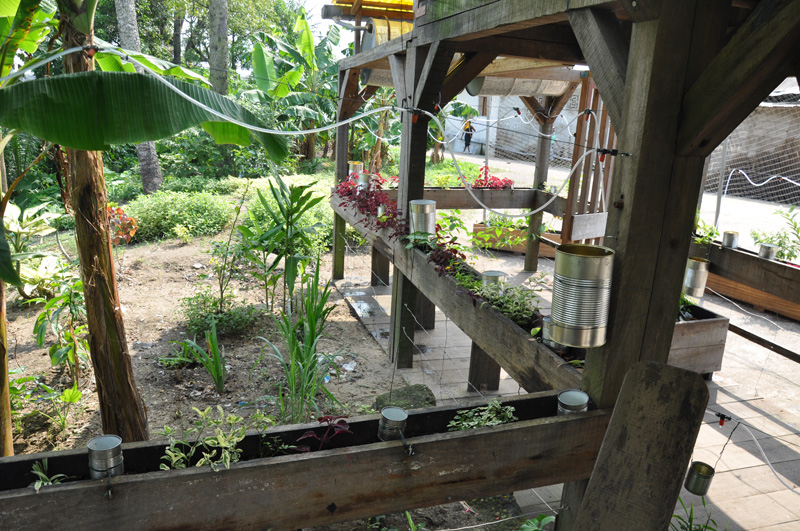

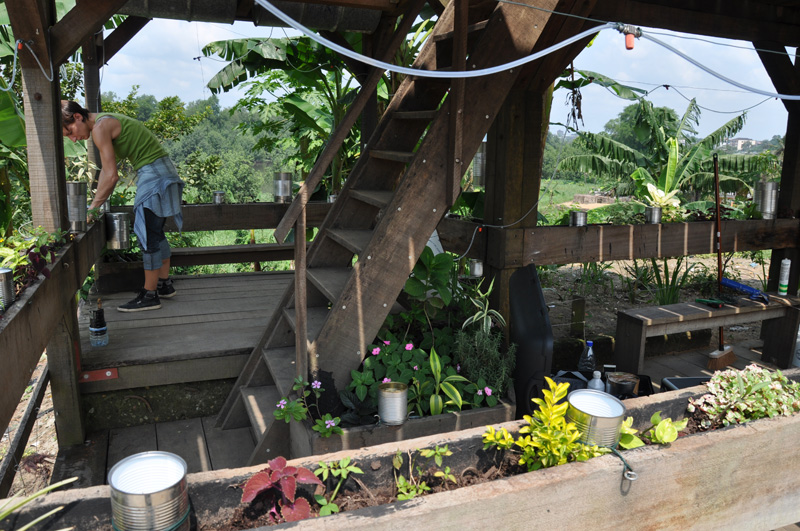

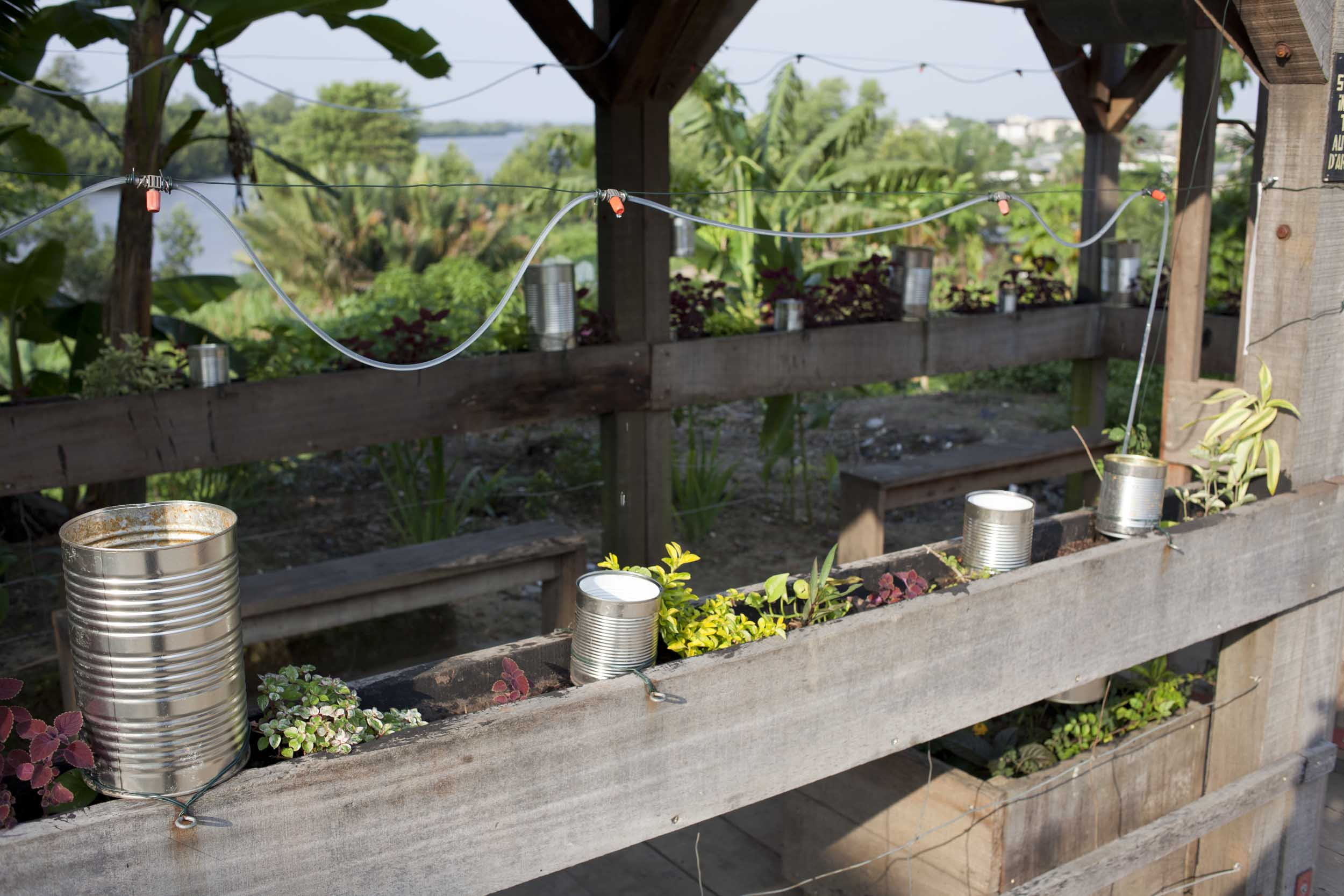

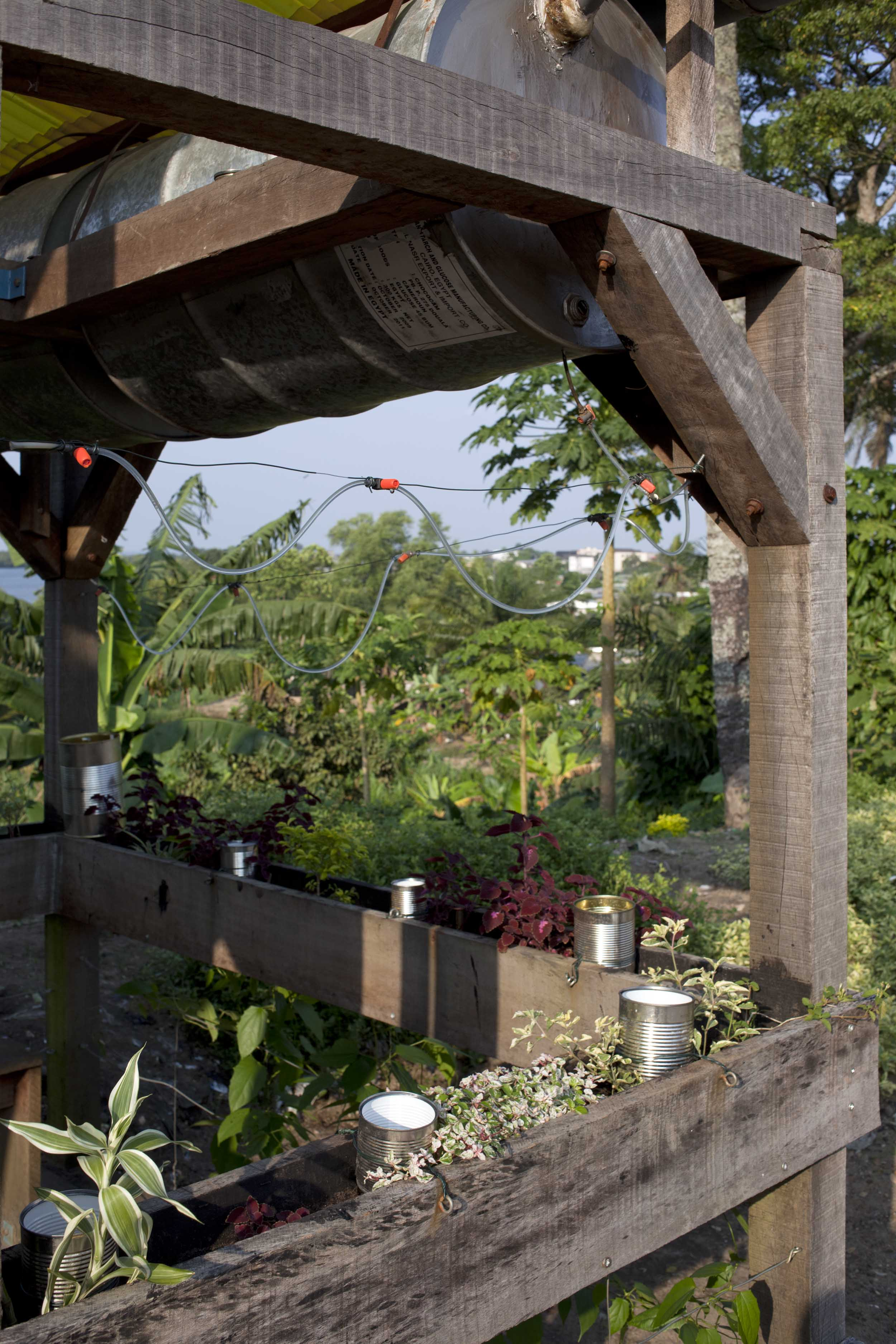

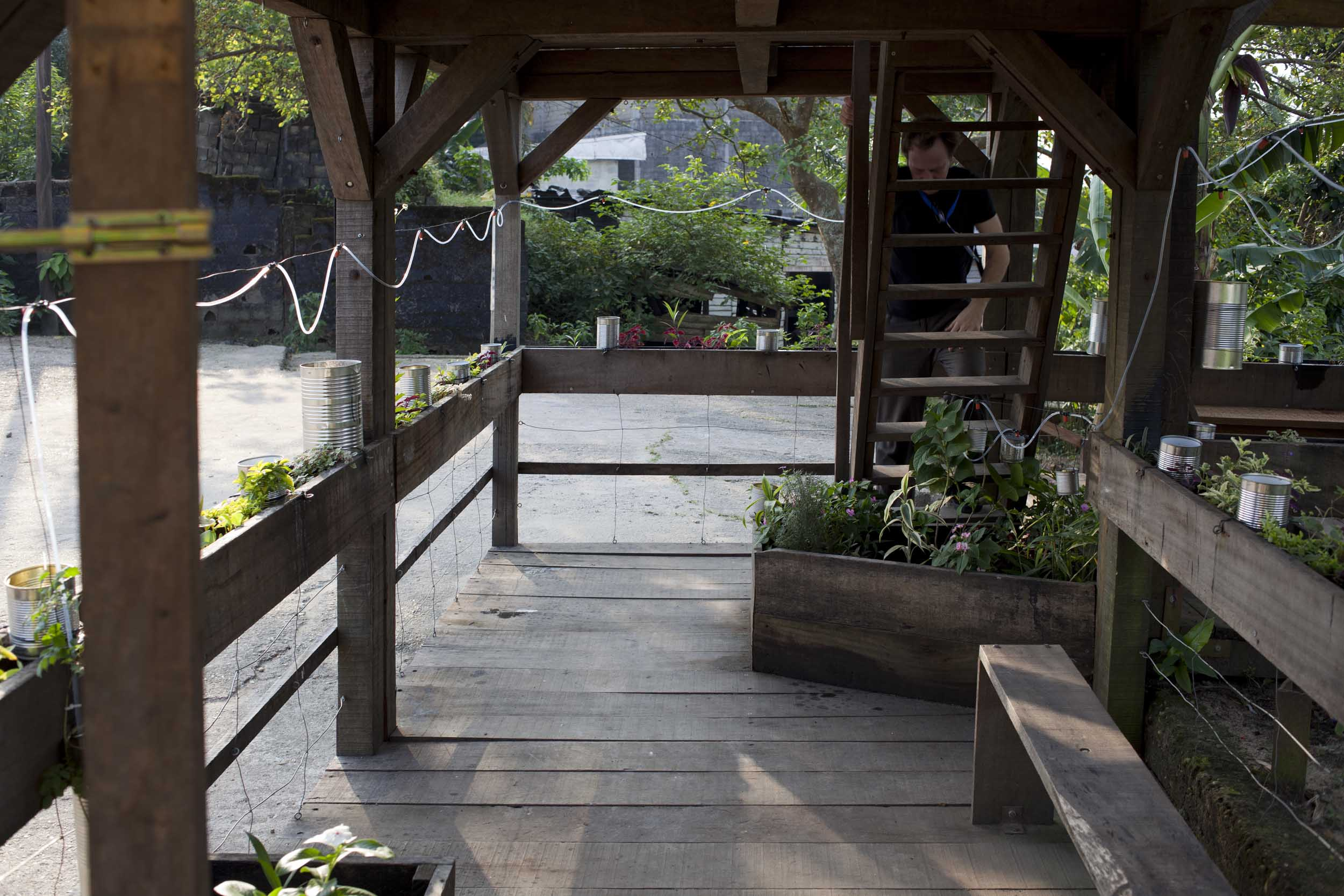

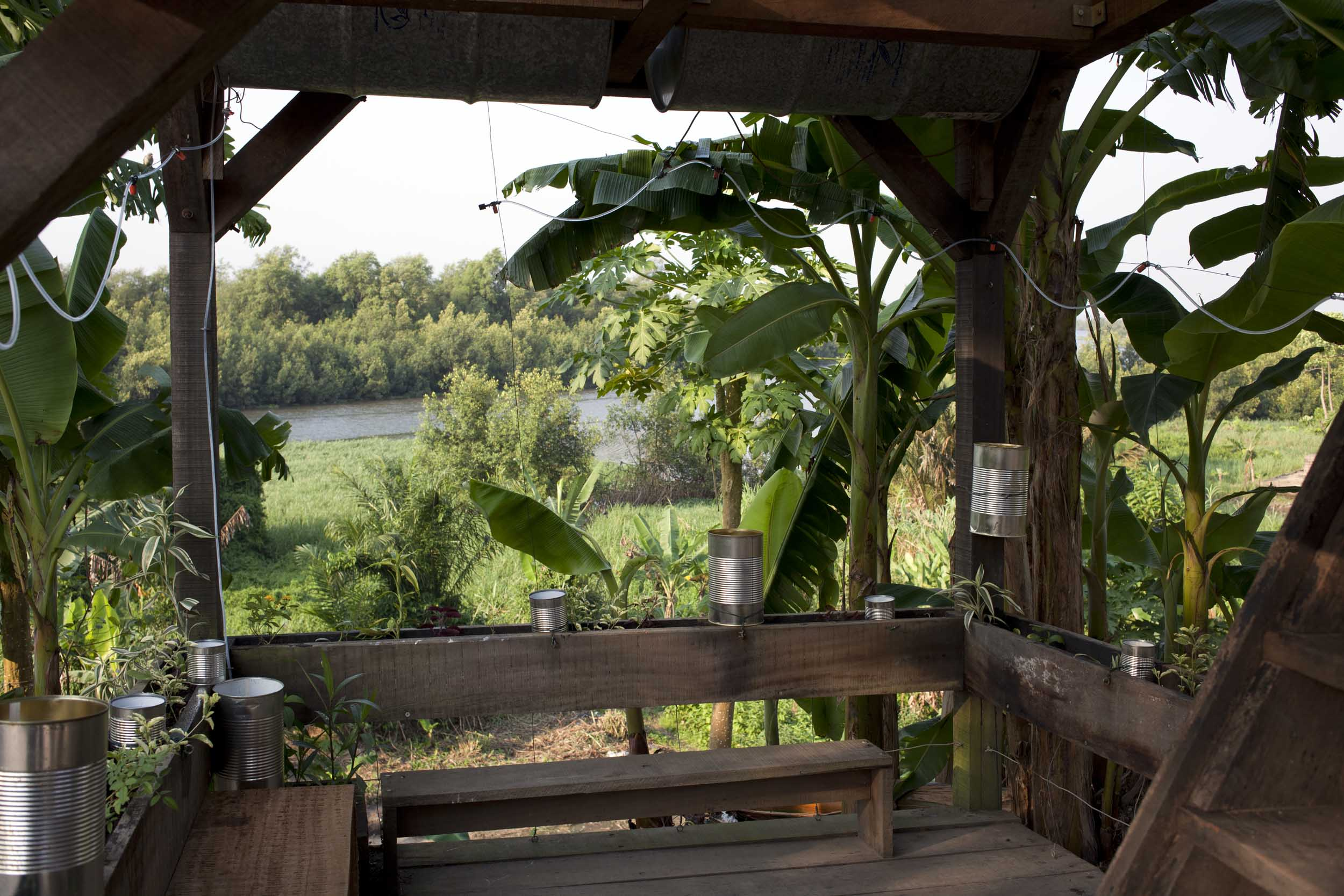

Le Jardin sonore was restored in 2012 and 2013 with the repair and replacement of deteriorated wooden pieces.

== See also ==
=== Bibliography ===
- Pensa, Iolanda (Ed.) 2017. Public Art in Africa. Art et transformations urbaines à Douala /// Art and Urban Transformations in Douala. Genève: Metis Presses. ISBN 978-2-94-0563-16-6
- Kaze, R. and Tchakam, S. (2009): «Les mots écrits de New Bell de Hervé Yamguen». In Liquid n°03, (Juillet - Août - Septembre 2009).
- Verschuren, K., X. Nibbeling and L. Grandin. (2012): Making Douala 2007–2103, Rotterdam, ICU art project
- Pensa, I. (2012): «Public Art and Urban Change in Douala». In Domus, (7 April 2012). http://www.domusweb.it/en/art/2012/04/09/public-art-and-urban-change-in-douala.html
- Van Der Lan, B. and Jenkins R.S. (eds) (2011). Douala: Intertwined Architectures, The Netherland: ArchiAfrica
- E.L. (2014): « Au bord du Fleuve Wouri, un jardin sonore et participatif» In Beaux Arts Magazine, L’art en Vacance. (Août 2014)
- Van der Lans, B. (2010): «Salon Urbaine de Douala 2010». In Architecture plus, (30 December 2010).
- Van der Lans, B. (2013): «Best practices in culture-based urban development». In David Adjaye and Simon Njami (Eds) Visionary Africa: Art & architecture at work (III Ed.). Brussels, European Commission and Centre for Fine Arts (bozar).
- Oforiatta-Ayim, N. (2011): «Speak Now». In Frieze Magazine, (1 May 2011). http://www.frieze.com/article/speak-now
- Greenberg, K. (2012): «La ville en tant que site: création d’un public pour l’art contemporain en Afrique». In Carson Chan, Nadim Samman (Eds.) Higher Atlas / Au-delà de l’Atlas – The Marrakech Biennale [4] in Context. Sternberg Press
- Schemmel, A. (2011) « Main discourses of the 2nd Salon Urbain de Douala (SUD) in Cameroon seen by an Indian runner duck». In Andrea Heister, Bonaventure Soh Bejeng Ndikung, (Re-) Mapping the field: a bird's eye view on discourses. Berlin Germany, Savvy. Art, Contemporary, Africa.
- Lettera 27, (2013): «Trasformazioni urbane: l’edizione 2013 di SUD, a Douala» In Lettera 27. (29 Novembre 2013)
- Marta Pucciarelli (2014) Final Report. University of Applied Sciences and Arts of Southern Switzerland, Laboratory of visual culture.

=== Related articles ===
- List of public art in Douala
- Contemporary African art
