= In Praise of Copying =

2010 book by Marcus Boon

- Author: Marcus Boon
- Genre: Non-fiction
- Publisher: Harvard University Press
- Publication date: 2010

In Praise of Copying is a nonfiction book by Canadian author Marcus Boon.

== History ==
The book was published in 2010 by Harvard University Press and is licensed under the Creative Commons license by-nc-sa (Attribution–Noncommercial–ShareAlike).

== Synopsis ==
Boon has dealt with the issue of copies, imitations and the concept of the original. Starting from the observation that copying is a universally popular, but often criminal practice, he developed a point of view which holds that the distinction between copy and original is for practical purposes only. Boon argues in the book that for everything in the universe there already is a copy, as much as everything is original. Therefore, it is impossible under ethics to ban the copy, since it is impossible not to copy. The distinction between originality and copy creates an artificial boundary which in truth does not exist. Copies are the principle on which the universe rests, even at the molecular level all the things are made by copying. Learning itself cannot occur without copying from others.

The distinction between (legitimate) original and (illegitimate) copy developed in Western Europe. It goes back to philosophical concepts that Plato and Aristotle created. In particular, Boon sees at work the nominalism of Plato, who introduced the idea of an unchanging and unattainable original in Western philosophy. The distinction between original and copy is in its modern incarnation represented by copyright but is actually a consequence of industrial capitalism. This distinction is threatening to undermine the culture of the world and thus to marginalize other systems of reproduction. Boon uses examples from non-European cultures and especially from Buddhism to question the existence of the original in itself.

== Reception ==
The book has been reviewed by the New Yorker, New Republic, The Wire magazine, the American E-Journal, Pop Matters, Rorotoko, and the University of Chicago Library News.
