= Liero =

1998 action video game

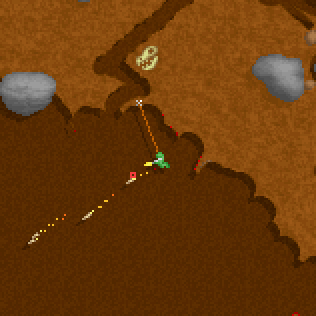
- Screenshot of Liero. The player is using the ninja rope to hang from a clump of dirt while shooting at the enemy with rockets.
- Original author: Joosa Riekkinen
- Developers: Erik Lindroos and community
- Release: January 1, 1998; 28 years ago
- Stable release: 1.33 / 1 January 1999; 27 years ago
- Preview release: 1.36 / 5 March 2016; 10 years ago
- Platform: Crossplatform (originally MS-DOS)
- Type: Single-player/multiplayer action game
- License: WTFPL
- Website: www.liero.be

Liero is a video game for MS-DOS, first released by Finnish programmer Joosa Riekkinen in 1998. The game has been described as a real-time version of Worms (a turn-based artillery game). Liero [ˈlie̯ro] is Finnish for 'earthworm'. Inspired itself by the earlier game MoleZ, Liero provided inspiration for the later games Soldat and Noita.

== Gameplay ==
In Liero, two worms fight each other to death for score (or frags) using a choice of five weapons from a total of 40 in a two-dimensional map. Most of the terrain, except for indestructible rocks, may be dug or destroyed by explosions. In addition to the weaponry, each player has a ninja rope which can be used to move faster through the map. This grappling hook-like device substitutes for jetpacks and can even latch onto the enemy worm to drag them closer to their foe.

While playing, there are health power-ups to heal the player's worm. It is also possible to replace one of the five weapons by picking up bonuses. Before playing, certain weapons can be selected to be available only in bonuses, in the entire game, or completely disabled.

Unlike most side-scrolling deathmatch games, the weapons in Liero have infinite ammo. Key factors of weapons include their reload rate and how fast they shoot, whereas in most other games of this type, key factors of weapons include how much ammo they sport and how frequently more ammo for that weapon can be found. Liero depends all on timing and swift maneuverability.

The gameplay mode can be deathmatch, Game of Tag or Capture the Flag. It can be played by two human players simultaneously in split screen or in a single player mode against the game's artificial intelligence, although the game's popularity is derived mostly from the fast-paced player-vs.-player action it provides.

== Development history ==
=== Original Liero by Joosa Riekkinen ===
Joosa Riekkinen developed Liero as DOS game with the first version released in 1998. Liero was inspired by the previous freeware game MoleZ, and took many weapons and sounds from its precursor. The original Liero's latest version was 1.33, which was released in 1999. However, the author lost the Pascal source code in a hard disk crash, and due to the lack of backup, no new "classic" versions have been released since.

=== Community developments ===
Despite this, and with the author's approval, the Liero community has distributed several altered (or hacked) versions of the game through the LieroCDC, and others.

=== Merge ===
In 2009, "classic" Liero was officially merged with the OpenLiero project upon the release of Liero 1.34 (not to be confused with the total conversion by that name). The new versions are released by Gliptic, although Joosa Riekkinen endorses them as official. The original Liero data and binary files by Riekkinen were released available under the WTFPL license.

Liero's last release was version 1.36, release September 3, 2013. This version is compatible with almost any OS but lacks network gaming (unlike some of the remakes).

== Clones, remakes and derivatives ==
=== Liero Xtreme ===
Liero Xtreme (often called LieroX, Liero Extreme or just LX) is a 2D shooter game. It is an unofficial sequel to Liero, and is the most popular of all the Liero clones. It features online play, fully customizable weapons, levels and characters. Liero Xtreme was created in C++ by Jason 'JasonB' Boettcher, an Australian programmer. With its source release on April 10, 2006, a new project has become available on October 24, 2006, known as OpenLieroX, while the development of the original LieroX project has stopped. At the time of writing (May 6, 2009), OpenLieroX has tripled in code size and has many new features.

The game is based on a deathmatch setting, where multiple players face off in a closed level. Each player is equipped with five weapons selected out of all the weapons allowed, and with a ninja rope that allows the player to move in any direction. Players begin with a set amount of lives, and whilst the game records the number of kills, the last man standing is usually considered the winner. Liero Xtreme also allows team deathmatches, which has made it common for players to form clans. OpenLieroX runs on Windows, on MacOSX, on Linux and on FreeBSD.

The first release announcement of Liero Extreme was made on October 14, 2002. LieroX has become very famous over the time. On February 14, 2006, Jason Boettcher stopped the LieroX development for good. The last version he released was 0.62b, which had many new features, but suffered from crashes and various errors, and did not catch on within the community which continues to play the 0.56b version. Before leaving the community, he released the source code of the even older version 0.55b under the zlib license. Development of LieroXtreme is now in hands of Karel Petranek and Albert Zeyer, used the source code to create OpenLieroX, which is compatible with the popular 0.56b version, but has multiple new features and bugfixes. Michał Futer took care of the new frontend. Currently the majority of players play OpenLieroX.

As a customizable game, it allows players and developers to script their own mods. Different mods have different sets of unique weapons, and may also differ in player gravity and movement. The default mod is Liero 1.0, also called Classic, which is roughly equal to the basic setting in original Liero. On top of this, several player-created mods are included in the standard game packs, some of which are more popular than the default setting. Similarly to Liero, the default level is Dirt Level, consisting of diggable terrain with some indestructible rock. The default level is comparatively rarely played compared to more complex player-created levels.

The game interface allow players to modify factors of the game such as which weapons in a mod are allowed, and how fast they reload and many other parameters which have huge impact on the game play.

Ground Force

Remake of Liero With a completely new engine built from scratch with Cellular-Automata features with full Multiplayer Capabilities, Level Editor, voice chat, Lan Support, Mod Support, Custom abilities and with support up to 12 players in active Development

=== NiL ===
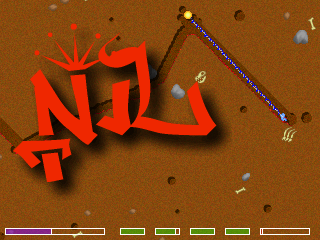
Screenshot of NiL

NiL (recursive acronym for NiL Isn't Liero) is a clone of Liero, which runs on Linux and Windows and is released under the terms of the GNU General Public License. NiL is not limited to two players, like the original Liero is. It doesn't limit the number of players over a TCP network. It was met with considerable enthusiasm in the Linux gaming community.

The project was initiated by Flemming Frandsen in winter 1999 after he had stumbled across Liero, which he liked so much that he decided to reimplement it under Linux. He abandoned the project five months later, due to being too busy for it. NiL was dead until the beginning of 2004 when Christoph Brill, found out about the project and took over as maintainer. Thereafter Daniel Schneidereit joined the project as well, but soon left. Other contributors included Nils Thuerey, Harri Liusvaara, David Hewitt and Phil Howlett.

Development proceeded slowly as the project's source code became almost unmaintainable and NiL was lacking developers. By mid-2005 Alexander Kahl joined development, convinced Christoph to start over and re-think the whole concept of NiL, as the other Liero clone Gusanos already existed at that time. Development seems to have stopped around mid-2006.

=== OpenLieroX ===
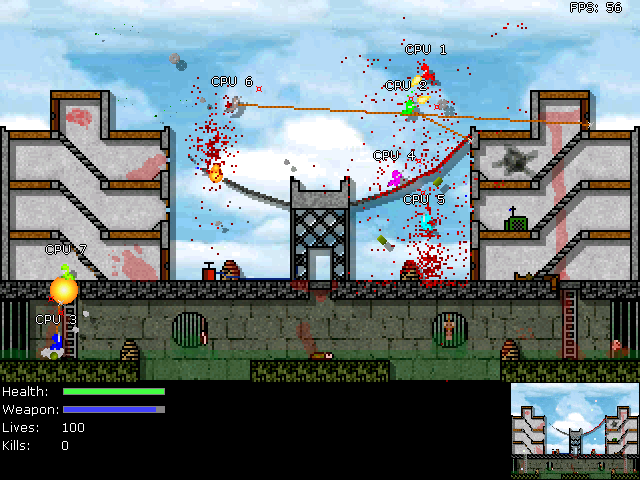
OpenLieroX gameplay

OpenLieroX is a remake of classic Liero, built from scratch in a new engine. It adds many features to the game, such as modding support, custom sprites, maps, and weapons, and online and LAN play. The game also supports more than two players at once.

=== WebLiero ===
Classic-like Liero clone in web browser with multiplayer capability.

== Modification ==
Liero is a versatile game in terms of modification. All of its 40 weapons can be completely replaced with new ones that can be given different images and sound effects from the original set. The images of the worms themselves can be transformed into completely different characters, although their movement animations are less flexible regarding modification. The maps can be given permanent terrain other than rocks alone. Destroyable terrain can also be colored more than simply plain dirt. The AI can be modified to be harder or easier. Nearly the whole game can be converted into something entirely different, except for the main aspect having to do with slaughtering another player/AI.

== Reception and usage ==
In 2006 Liero received a TopDog award from Home of the Underdogs. OpenLieroX has been positively reviewed by multiple gaming news sites. In 2013 Derek Yu's webpage TIGSource reviewed Liero v1.36 favorably.

The Liero variants NiL, Gusanos, and OpenLieroX were downloaded multiple hundred thousand times from SourceForge alone between 2001 and 2016.

Calling Liero a "masterpiece", Liero was selected for a collection of 100 classic Finnish games, which were presented on the opening of the Finnish Museum of Games in Tampere in 2017.
