= Public-domain-equivalent license =

License that waives all copyright

WTFPL license logo, a public-domain-like license

CC0 license logo, a copyright waiver and public-domain-like license

Unlicense logo, a copyright waiver and public-domain-like license

Public-domain-equivalent licenses also known as public-domain-like licenses are licenses that grant public-domain-like rights and/or act as waivers. They are used to make copyrighted works usable by anyone without conditions, while avoiding the complexities of attribution or license compatibility that occur with other licenses.

No permission or license is required for a work truly in the public domain, such as one with an expired copyright; such a work may be copied at will. Public domain equivalent licenses exist because some legal jurisdictions do not provide for authors to voluntarily place their work in the public domain, but do allow them to grant arbitrarily broad rights in the work to the public.

The licensing process also allows authors, particularly software authors, the opportunity to explicitly deny any implied warranty that might give someone a basis for legal action against them. While there is no universally agreed-upon license, several licenses aim to grant the same rights that would apply to a work in the public domain.

== Licenses ==
=== General ===
==== WTFPL ====
In 2000, the "Do What the Fuck You Want To Public License" (WTFPL) was released as a public-domain-equivalent license for software. It is distinguished among software licenses by its informal style and lack of a warranty disclaimer. In 2016, according to Black Duck Software, (Note: 1. MIT License: 26%; 2. GNU General Public License (GPL) 2.0: 21%; 3. Apache License 2.0: 16%; 4. GNU General Public License (GPL) 3.0: 9%; 5. BSD License 2.0 (3-clause, New or Revised) License: 6%; 6. GNU Lesser General Public License (LGPL) 2.1: 4%; 7. Artistic License (Perl): 4%; 8. GNU Lesser General Public License (LGPL) 3.0: 2%; 9. ISC License: 2%; 10. Microsoft Public License: 2%; 11. Eclipse Public License (EPL): 2%; 12. Code Project Open License 1.02: 1%; 13. Mozilla Public License (MPL) 1.1: < 1%; 14. Simplified BSD License (BSD): < 1%; 15. Common Development and Distribution License (CDDL): < 1%; 16. GNU Affero General Public License v3 or later: < 1%; 17. Microsoft Reciprocal License: < 1%; 18. Sun GPL With Classpath Exception v2.0: < 1%; 19. DO WHAT THE FUCK YOU WANT TO PUBLIC LICENSE: < 1%; 20: CDDL-1.1: < 1%) the WTFPL was used by less than 1% of FOSS projects.

==== CC0 ====
In 2009, Creative Commons released CC0, which was created for compatibility with jurisdictions where dedicating to public domain is problematic, such as continental Europe. This is achieved by a public-domain waiver statement and a fall-back all-permissive license, for cases where the waiver is not valid. The Free Software Foundation and the Open Knowledge Foundation approved CC0 as a recommended license to dedicate content to the public domain. The FSF and the Open Source Initiative, however, do not recommend the usage of this license for software due to inclusion of a clause expressly stating it does not grant patent licenses. In June 2016 an analysis of the Fedora Project's software packages placed CC0 as the 17th most popular license. (Note: There are total 19,221 approved packages in Fedora repository as found on 20.06.2016, among those 1124 were dead packages. […] From the above chart it is clear that the GPL family is the highest used (I had miscalculated it as MIT before).The other major licenses are MIT, BSD, the LGPL family, Artistic (for Perl packages), LPPL (foe texlive packages), ASL. Apart from these licenses there are projects who has submitted themselves in to Public Domain and that number is 517 and 11 packages have mentioned their license as Unlicense.)

=== Software ===
==== Unlicense ====
The Unlicense software license, published around 2010, offers a public-domain waiver text with a fall-back public-domain-like license, inspired by permissive licenses but without an attribution clause. In 2015 GitHub reported that approximately 102,000 of their 5.1 million licensed projects, or 2%, use the Unlicense. (Note: 1. MIT: 44.69%; 2. Other: 15.68%; 3. GPLv2: 12.96%; 4. Apache: 11.19%; 5. GPLv3: 8.88%; 6. BSD 3-clause: 4.53%; 7. Unlicense: 1.87%; 8. BSD 2-clause: 1.70%; 9. LGPLv3: 1.30%; 10. AGPLv3: 1.05% (30 mill * 2% * 17% = 102k))

==== 0BSD ====
The BSD Zero Clause License, published in 2013, removes half a sentence from the ISC license, leaving only an unconditional grant of rights and a warranty disclaimer. It is listed by the Software Package Data Exchange as the Zero Clause BSD license, with the SPDX identifier 0BSD. It was first used by Rob Landley in Toybox and is OSI-approved.

==== MIT-0 ====
The MIT No Attribution License, a variation of the MIT License, was published in 2018 and has the identifier MIT-0 in the SPDX License List.

== Reception ==
In the free-software community, there has been some controversy over whether a public domain dedication constitutes a valid open-source license. In 2004, lawyer Lawrence Rosen argued in the essay "Why the public domain isn't a license" that software could not truly be given into public domain, a position that faced opposition by Daniel J. Bernstein and others. In 2012, Rosen changed his mind, accepted CC0 as an open-source license, and admitted that, contrary to his previous claims, copyright can be waived away.

In 2011, the Free Software Foundation added CC0 to its free software licenses and called it "the preferred method of releasing software in the public domain" – the Foundation then reviewed its position specifically for software.

In February 2012, when the CC0 license was submitted to the Open Source Initiative for approval, controversy arose over a clause which excluded any relevant patents held by the copyright holder from the scope of the license. This clause was added with scientific data in mind rather than software, but some members of the OSI believed it could weaken users' defenses against software patents. As a result, Creative Commons withdrew their submission, and the license is not currently approved by the OSI. In July 2022, the Fedora Project deprecated CC0 for software code for the same reasons, but will still allow its use for non-code content.

In June 2020, following a request for legacy approval, OSI formally recognized the Unlicense as an approved license meeting the OSD.

Google does not allow its employees to contribute to projects under public domain equivalent licenses like the Unlicense and CC0, while allowing contributions to 0BSD licensed and US government PD projects.

== See also ==
- Beerware
- Public domain
- Public Domain Mark
- Public-domain software
- Public copyright license
