= World Intellectual Property Day =

Day to raise awareness of intellectual property

- Observed by: Globally
- Celebrations: onsite events, conferences, exhibitions, competitions, workshops, webinars.
- Observances: #WorldIPDay
- Date: 26 April
- Frequency: Annual
- Related to: Inventors' Day, World Book and Copyright Day

World Intellectual Property Day is observed annually on 26 April. The event was established by the World Intellectual Property Organization (WIPO) in 2000 to "raise awareness of how patents, copyright, trademarks and designs impact on daily life" and "to celebrate creativity, and the contribution made by creators and innovators to the development of economies and societies across the globe". 26 April was chosen as the date for World Intellectual Property Day because it coincides with the date on which the Convention Establishing the World Intellectual Property Organization entered into force in 1970. World Intellectual Property Day is WIPO’s largest intellectual property (IP) public outreach campaign.

== History ==
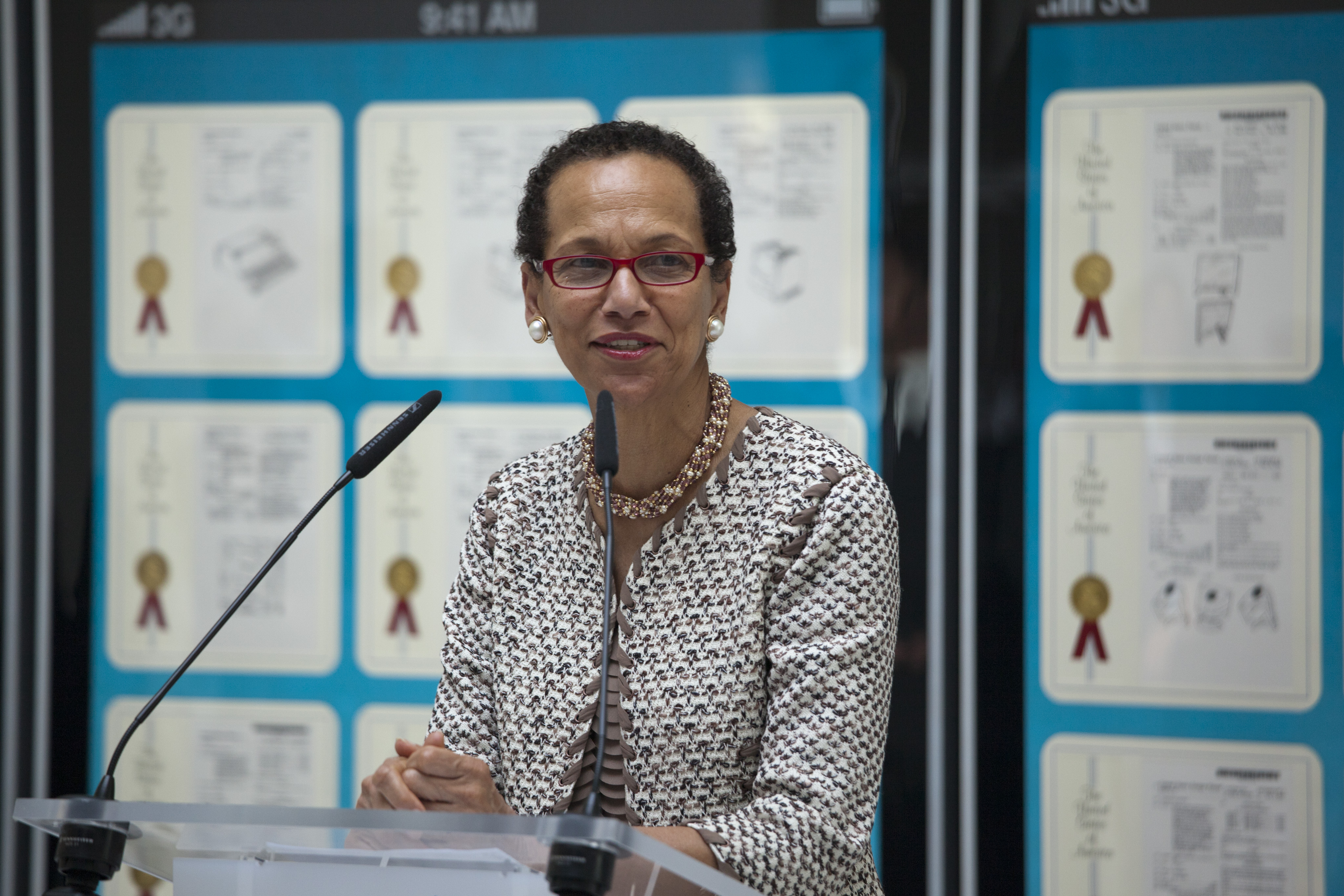
An exhibition showing the intellectual property (IP) behind Steve Jobs' innovations opened to the public at WIPO from 30 March 2012, to World Intellectual Property Day on 26 April 2012. The exhibition tied in with 2012's World Intellectual Property Day theme – 'Visionary Innovators'.

In a statement to the 33rd Session of the Assemblies of the Member States of WIPO in September 1988, the Director General of the National Algerian Institute for Industrial Property (INAPI) “suggested that an International Intellectual Property Day be instituted." In a subsequent letter to the WIPO Director General dated 7 April 1999, Mr. Amor Bouhnik, Director General of INAPI noted that the aim of establishing such a day "would be to set up a framework for broader mobilization and awareness, to open up access to the promotional aspect of innovation and to recognize the achievements of promoters of intellectual property throughout the world."

On 9 August 1999, in a letter from Jiang Ying, Commissioner of the State Intellectual Property Office of the People’s Republic of China, the Chinese delegation proposed "that WIPO adopt the commemoration of its 30th anniversary of founding (26 April) as the “World Intellectual Property Day," as an annual event. The Commissioner noted that the aim of doing so was “to further promote the awareness of intellectual property protection, expand the influence of intellectual property protection across the world, urge countries to publicize and popularize intellectual property protection laws and regulations, enhance the public legal awareness of intellectual property rights, encourage invention-innovation activities in various countries and strengthen international exchange in the intellectual property field."

In October 1999, at its 26th session, the General Assembly of WIPO approved the idea of declaring a particular day as a World Intellectual Property Day.

Engagement by WIPO’s member states in World Intellectual Property Day has risen since its inception in 2000. In its first year, member states from 59 countries reported official World Intellectual Property Day events. Five years later, in 2005, 110 countries reported official World Intellectual Property Day events, and in 2022, the campaign attracted users from 189 member states.

== International events ==
Every year hundreds of events are organized around the world by IP offices, law firms, private companies, students and others to celebrate inventors and creators and to promote understanding about the intellectual property system and its associated rights (e.g. copyrights, trademarks, patents, design rights, trade secrets, plant variety rights).

While World Intellectual Property Day is celebrated every year on 26 April, many countries hold their World Intellectual Property Day celebrations on another date. Some, including Peru and Singapore, organize a World Intellectual Property Day week, while others, such as Algeria, roll events out over a month. While WIPO identifies a theme and produces a range of promotional materials around that theme, each country may develop its own national campaign in line with local needs.

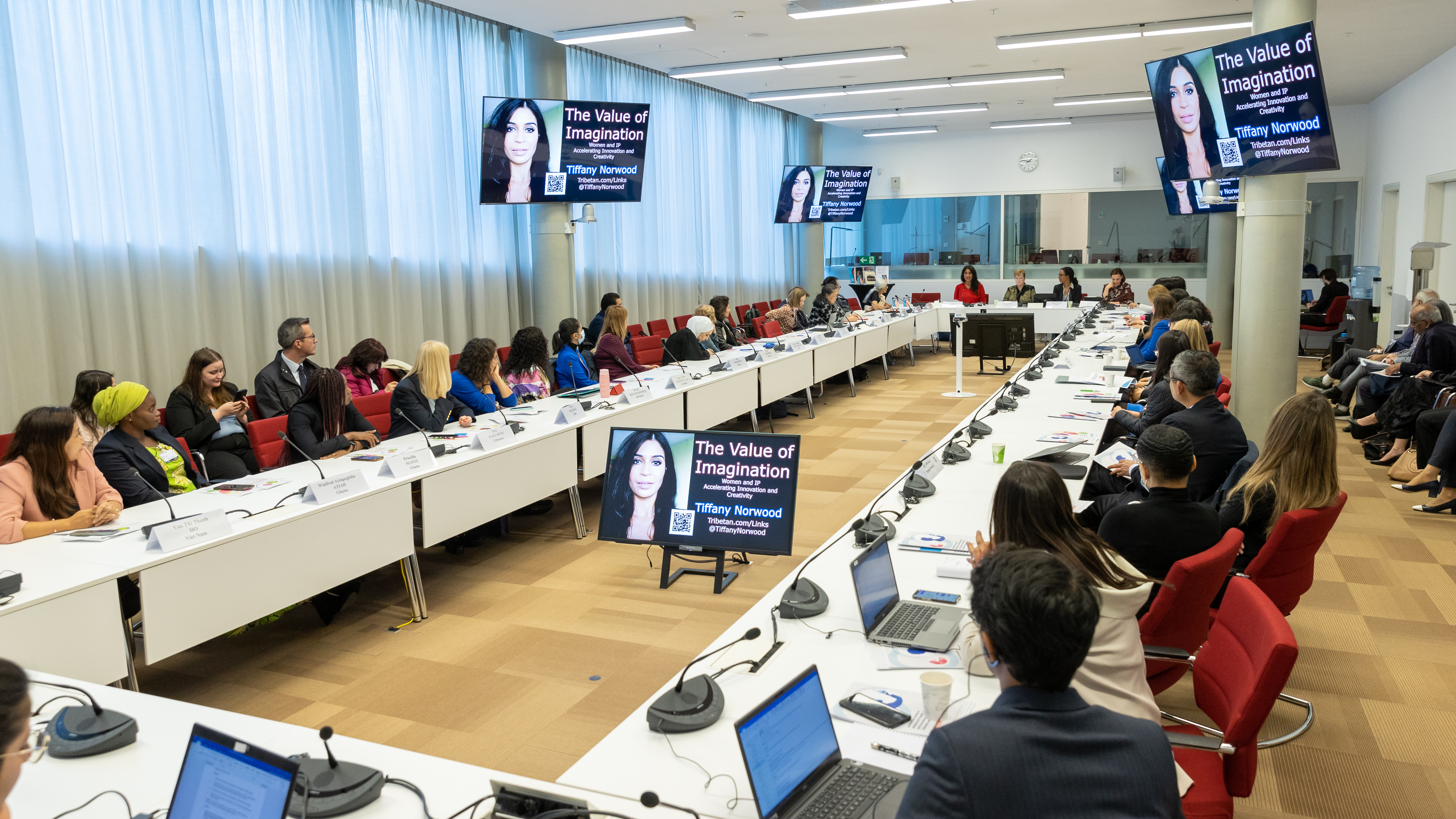
Women in Science – Shaping the Future Roundtable event at WIPO to mark World Intellectual Property Day 2023.

To celebrate World IP Day 2023, WIPO, in collaboration with UNESCO and the Korean Intellectual Property Office (KIPO), brought together women experts in science, including Laureates from the “L’Oréal-UNESCO For Women in Science Program" to discuss strategies that women can employ to create value from their research, practical ways to encourage women and young girls to enter STEM fields, and how intellectual property has enabled them to implement their research to give real-world benefits.

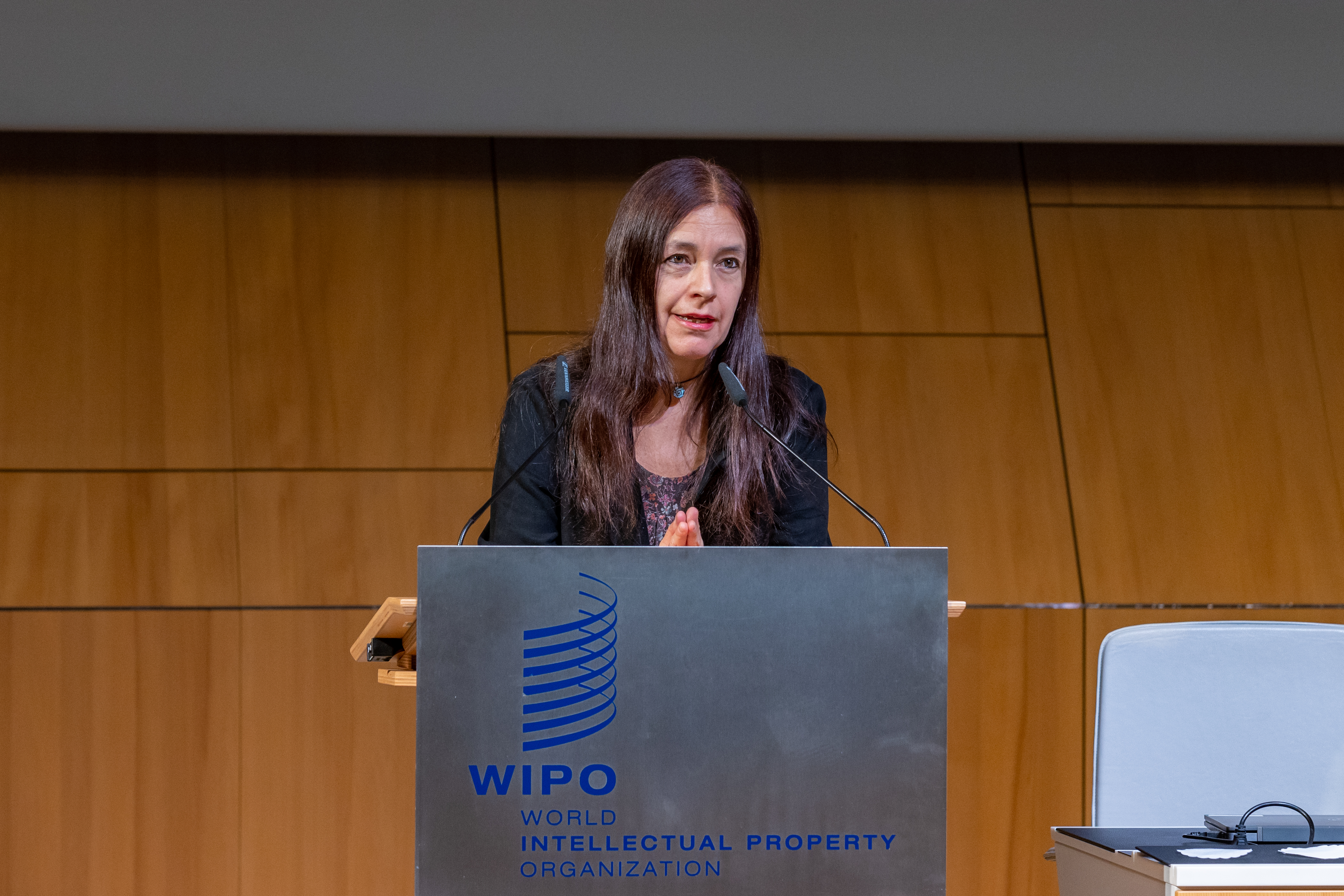
Rosanna Díaz Costa, Director, "Un Mundo para Julius / A World for Julius", speaks at the "Film Industry: A Woman’s Perspective" event at WIPO to mark World Intellectual Property Day 2023.

WIPO also hosted the event "Film Industry: A Woman’s Perspective" in collaboration with the Permanent Mission of Peru to the International Organizations in Geneva. The event included a screening of the award-winning film, “Un Mundo para Julius / A World for Julius” and featured a discussion with Rosanna Díaz Costa, the director, who shared her insights on the film industry from a woman's perspective.

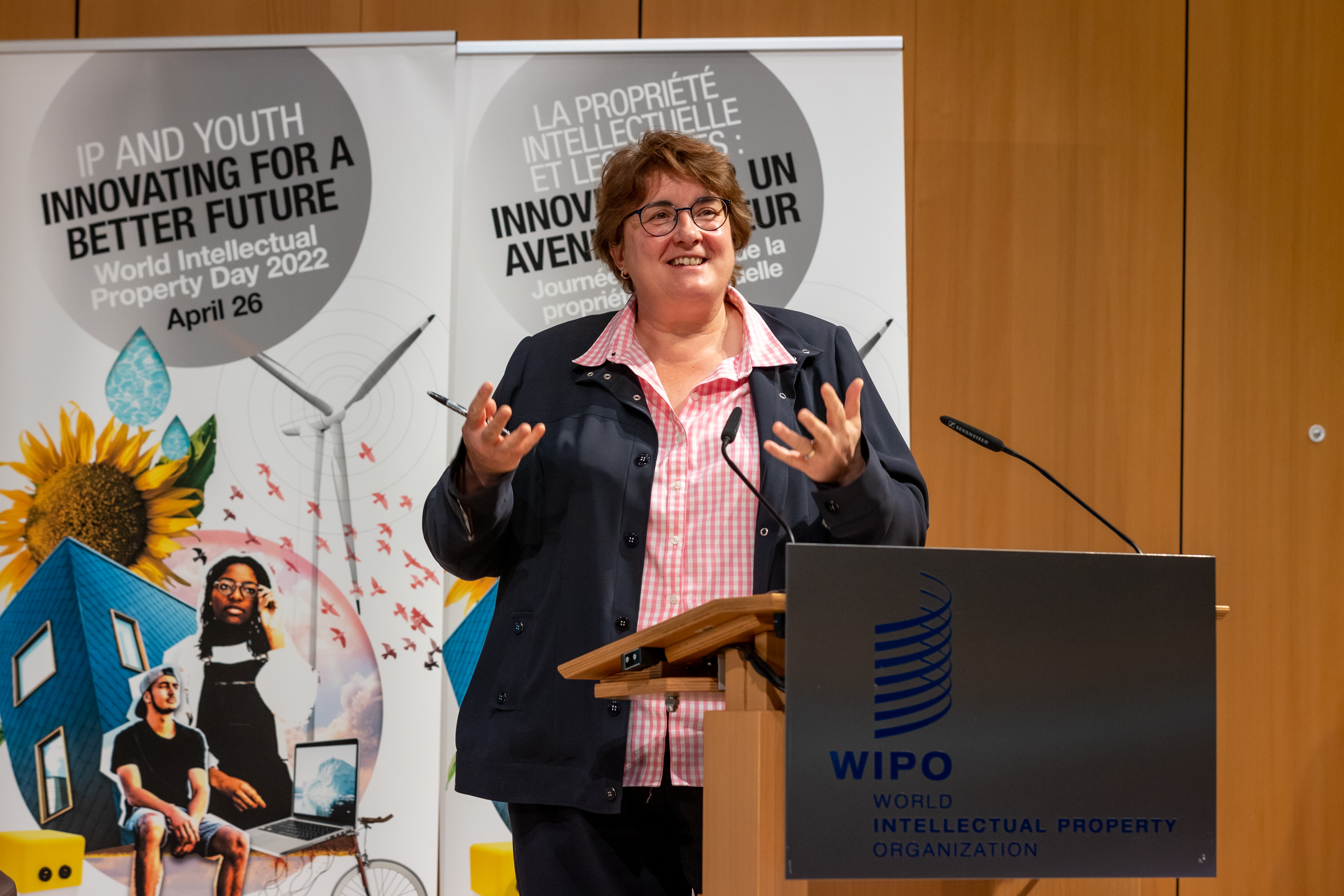
Catherine Jewell, Senior Information Officer, WIPO Information and Digital Outreach Division, announces the winners of the 2022 World Intellectual Property Day Youth Video Competition.

For World Intellectual Property Day 2022, nearly 600 World Intellectual Property Day events were recorded across the globe on topical issues relating to the campaign theme IP and Youth: Innovating for a Better Future, ranging from the protection of comics in Peru, to IP and the blockchain. World Intellectual Property Day is also an opportunity for leading policymakers to express their support for World Intellectual Property Day and to highlight the relevance of intellectual property to regional and national economic development. World Intellectual Property Day 2022 also featured a panel discussion on Innovating for Better Health: Supporting Young Innovators through IP, was organized in collaboration with the International Federation of Pharmaceutical Manufacturers & Associations (IFPMA) with the support of the Geneva Health Forum and Speak UP Africa, which brought together young innovators/entrepreneurs and mentors from various countries and international experts. World Intellectual Property Day 2022 also featured the first World Intellectual Day Youth Video Competition. In the Report of the Director General Daren Tang to the Assemblies of WIPO in July 2022, WIPO Director General said, I am also happy to report that this year's World Intellectual Property Day attracted record global engagement. Themed around ‘IP and Youth: Innovating for a Better Future’, we recorded over 15 million impressions across our digital platforms and there were nearly 600 World Intellectual Property Day events across 189 Member States, our largest participation ever.

== Themes ==
Each year, the campaign is rolled out around a topical theme:

- 2026 - IP and Sports: Ready, Set, Innovate
- 2025 – Intellectual property and music: Feel the beat of IP
- 2024 – IP and the SDGs: Building our common future with innovation and creativity
- 2023 – Women and IP: Accelerating Innovation and Creativity
- 2022 – IP and Youth: Innovating for a Better Future
- 2021 – IP and SMEs: Taking Your Ideas to Market
- 2020 – Innovate for a Green Future
- 2019 – Reach for Gold: IP and Sports
- 2018 – Powering Change: Women in Innovation and Creativity
- 2017 – Innovation – Improving Lives
- 2016 – Digital Creativity: Culture Reimagined.
- 2015 – Get Up, Stand Up. For Music.
- 2014 – Movies – a Global Passion
- 2013 – Creativity – The Next Generation
- 2012 – Visionary Innovators
- 2011 – Designing the Future
- 2010 – Innovation – Linking the World
- 2009 – Green Innovation
- 2008 – Celebrating innovation and promoting respect for intellectual property
- 2007 – Encouraging Creativity
- 2006 – It Starts with an Idea
- 2005 – Think, Imagine, Create
- 2004 – Encouraging Creativity
- 2003 – Make Intellectual Property Your Business
- 2002 – Encouraging Creativity
- 2001 – Creating the Future Today

== Criticism ==
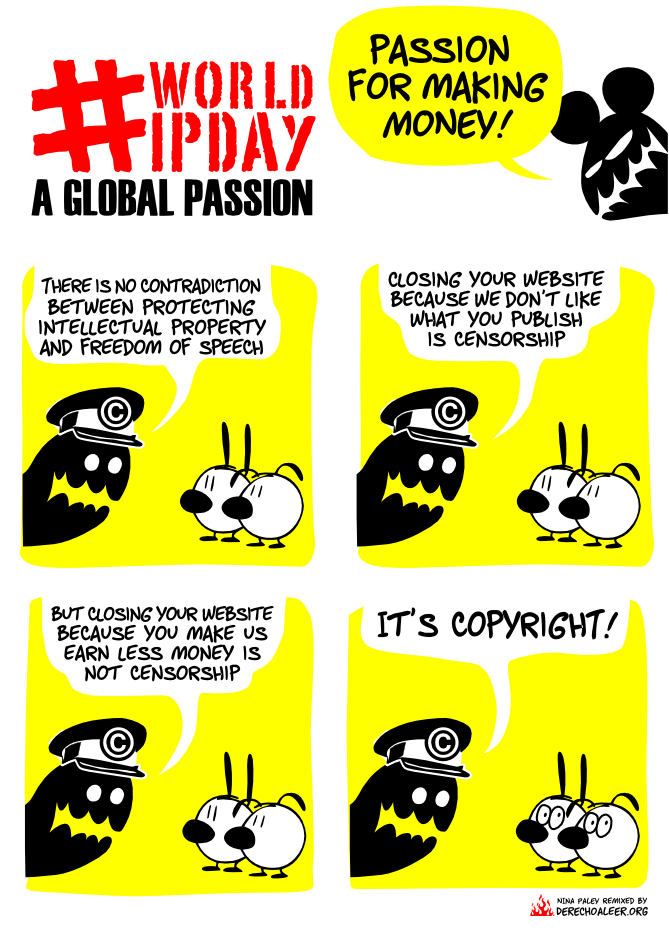
"IP censure", a cartoon discussing concepts of censorship and copyright on the occasion of the World Intellectual Property Day

This event has been criticized by a number of intellectual property activists and scholars as one-sided propaganda in favor of traditional copyright, ignoring alternatives related to copyleft and the free culture movement. Mike Masnick of Techdirt wrote that World Intellectual Property Day is intended "to promote ever greater protectionism and mercantilism in favor of copyright holders and patent holders, while ignoring any impact on the public of those things. It's a fairly disgusting distortion of the claimed intent of intellectual property." Zak Rogoff of Defective by Design noted that it is a "global but decidedly not grassroots event". It has also been criticized by activists from civil society organizations such as IP Justice and the Electronic Information for Libraries who consider it one-sided propaganda as the marketing materials associated with the event, provided by WIPO, "come across as unrepresentative of other views and events". Michael Geist, a law professor at the University of Ottawa, noted that "World Intellectual Property Day has become little more than a lobbyist day". Cushla Kapitzk from the Queensland University of Technology wrote that most of the WIPO's statements related to promotion of the World Intellectual Property Day are "either exaggerated or unsubstantiated"; noting that for example one of WIPO's claims used to promote this event, namely that "copyright helps bring music to our ears and art, films and literature before our eyes" is "tenuous at best, and lexical association of copyright with things recognised as having social and cultural value ('art', 'film' and 'literature') functions to legitimate its formulation and widespread application".

A number of grassroots-supported observances in opposition of prevalent IP laws celebrated by the World Intellectual Property Day exist, none of them supported by WIPO:

- Culture Freedom Day
- Document Freedom Day
- Hardware Freedom Day
- International Day Against DRM
- Public Domain Day
- Software Freedom Day

== See also ==
- Free culture
- Inventors' Day
- World Book and Copyright Day
- International Women's Day
- World Radio Day
