= March 21 =

March 21 this year in various calendars
- Saturday, 21 March 2026
Akan	Kurumemene
Armenian	4 Ahekani 1475
Aztec	Huei Tecuilhuitl 10, 6 Tecpatl
Babylonian	1 Adaru, 2336 SE
Balinese pawukon	Menga, Pasah, Laba, Paing, Paniron, Saniscara of Kelawu, Indra, Nohan, Dewa
Bengali	7 Chaitro, BS 1432
Chinese	Yang Wood Horse・Stomach Mansion; Fire Horse Year, Month 2, Day 3 (Chunfen, 15 days until Qingming)
Common Era	21 March 2026 CE
Coptic	12 Paremhat, AM 1742
Egyptian	9 Mesori, 2774 NE
Ethiopian	12 Magābit, 2018 Amätä Məhrät
French Republican	Décade I, Primidi de Germinal de l'Année 234 de la République
Gregorian	21 March, AD 2026
Hebrew	3 Nisan, AM 5786
Hindu	Aśvinī・Indra; Solar: 8 Caitra, 1947 SE; Lunisolar: Tr̥tīyā, Śukla pakṣa of Caitra, 2083 VE; Rāudra・5126 KY・1,872,655
Icelandic	Laugardagur, 28 Góa 2025
Islamic	2 Shawwal, AH 1447 (using tabular method)
ISO week date	2026-W12-6
Japanese	3 Kisaragi, Reiwa 8 (Shunbun, 15 days until Seimei)
Julian	8 March, AD 2026 (AM 7534)
Julian day	2461121
Korean	3 Tokkidal, 4359 DE
Maya	13.0.13.7.18; 16 Cumku, 6 Etznab
Roman	ante diem VIII Idus Martias, MMDCCLXXIX AUC
Solar Hijri	1 Farvardin, SH 1405
Tibetan	3 dbo, me pho rta 2153 or 1772 or 1000

<<	March					>>
Su	Mo	Tu	We	Th	Fr	Sa
1	2	3	4	5	6	7
8	9	10	11	12	13	14
15	16	17	18	19	20	21
22	23	24	25	26	27	28
29	30	31
2026

March 21 in recent years
2026 (Saturday)
2025 (Friday)
2024 (Thursday)
2023 (Tuesday)
2022 (Monday)
2021 (Sunday)
2020 (Saturday)
2019 (Thursday)
2018 (Wednesday)
2017 (Tuesday)

March 21 is the 80th day of the year (81st in leap years) in the Gregorian calendar; 285 days remain until the end of the year.

== Events ==
=== Pre-1600 ===
- 537 – Siege of Rome: King Vitiges attempts to assault the northern and eastern city walls, but is repulsed at the Praenestine Gate, known as the Vivarium, by the defenders under the Byzantine generals Bessas and Peranius.
- 630 – Emperor Heraclius returns the True Cross, one of the holiest Christian relics, to Jerusalem.
- 717 – Battle of Vincy between Charles Martel and Ragenfrid.
- 867 – An army of the Kingdom of Northumbria attempts to recapture York from the Great Heathen Army but is defeated in the battle of York.
- 1152 – Annulment of the marriage of King Louis VII of France and Queen Eleanor of Aquitaine.
- 1180 – Emperor Antoku accedes to the throne of Japan.
- 1349 – Erfurt massacre: Outbreak of an antisemitic pogrom in Erfurt, Germany, during which between 100 and up to 3000 Jews were killed by Christians after being accused of causing the Black Death.
- 1556 – On the day of his execution in Oxford, former archbishop of Canterbury Thomas Cranmer deviates from the scripted sermon by renouncing the recantations he has made and adds, "And as for the pope, I refuse him, as Christ's enemy, and Antichrist with all his false doctrine."

=== 1601–1900 ===
- 1788 – A fire in New Orleans leaves most of the town in ruins.
- 1800 – With the church leadership driven out of Rome during an armed conflict, Pius VII is crowned Pope in Venice with a temporary papal tiara made of papier-mâché.
- 1801 – The Battle of Alexandria is fought between British and French forces near the ruins of Nicopolis near Alexandria in Egypt.
- 1804 – Code Napoléon is adopted as French civil law.
- 1814 – Napoleonic Wars: Austrian forces repel French troops in the Battle of Arcis-sur-Aube.
- 1821 – Greek War of Independence: Greek revolutionaries seize Kalavryta.
- 1829 – The Wellington–Winchilsea duel takes place in London involving the Prime Minister the Duke of Wellington.
- 1844 – The Baháʼí calendar begins. This is the first day of the first year of the Baháʼí calendar. It is annually celebrated by members of the Baháʼí Faith as the Baháʼí New Year or Náw-Rúz.
- 1861 – Alexander H. Stephens gives the Cornerstone Speech.
- 1871 – Otto von Bismarck is appointed as the first Chancellor of the German Empire.
- 1871 – Journalist Henry Morton Stanley begins his trek to find the missionary and explorer David Livingstone.

=== 1901–present ===
- 1918 – World War I: The first phase of the German spring offensive, Operation Michael, begins.
- 1919 – The Hungarian Soviet Republic is established becoming the first Communist government to be formed in Europe after the October Revolution in Russia.
- 1921 – The New Economic Policy is implemented by the Bolshevik Party in response to the economic failure as a result of war communism.
- 1925 – The Butler Act prohibits the teaching of human evolution in Tennessee.
- 1925 – Syngman Rhee is removed from office after being impeached as the President of the Provisional Government of the Republic of Korea.
- 1925 – Ravel's opera L'enfant et les sortilèges, to a libretto by Colette, is premiered at the Opéra de Monte-Carlo.
- 1928 – Charles Lindbergh is presented with the Medal of Honor for the first solo trans-Atlantic flight.
- 1934 – The landmark Australian Eastern Mission led by John Latham departs on its three-month tour of East and South-East Asia.
- 1935 – Shah of Iran Reza Shah Pahlavi formally asks the international community to call Persia by its native name, Iran.
- 1937 – Ponce massacre: Nineteen unarmed civilians in Ponce, Puerto Rico are gunned down by police in a terrorist attack ordered by the US-appointed Governor, Blanton Winship.
- 1943 – Wehrmacht officer Rudolf von Gersdorff plots to assassinate Adolf Hitler by using a suicide bomb, but the plan falls through; von Gersdorff is able to defuse the bomb in time and avoid suspicion.
- 1945 – World War II: British troops liberate Mandalay, Burma.
- 1945 – World War II: Operation Carthage: Royal Air Force planes bomb Gestapo headquarters in Copenhagen, Denmark. They also accidentally hit a school, killing 125 civilians.
- 1945 – World War II: Bulgaria and the Soviet Union successfully complete their defense of the north bank of the Drava River as the Battle of the Transdanubian Hills concludes.
- 1946 – The Los Angeles Rams sign Kenny Washington, making him the first African American player in professional American football since 1933.
- 1952 – Alan Freed presents the Moondog Coronation Ball, the first rock and roll concert, in Cleveland, Ohio.
- 1960 – Apartheid: Sharpeville massacre, South Africa: Police open fire on a group of black South African demonstrators, killing 69 and wounding 180.
- 1963 – Alcatraz Federal Penitentiary closes.
- 1965 – Ranger program: NASA launches Ranger 9, the last in a series of uncrewed lunar space probes.
- 1965 – Martin Luther King Jr. leads 3,200 people on the start of the third and finally successful civil rights march from Selma to Montgomery, Alabama.
- 1968 – Battle of Karameh in Jordan between the Israel Defense Forces and the combined forces of the Jordanian Armed Forces and PLO.
- 1970 – The first Earth Day proclamation is issued by Joseph Alioto, Mayor of San Francisco.
- 1970 – San Diego Comic-Con, the largest pop and culture festival in the world, hosts its inaugural event.
- 1980 – Cold War: American President Jimmy Carter announces a United States boycott of the 1980 Summer Olympics in Moscow to protest the Soviet–Afghan War.
- 1983 – The first cases of the 1983 West Bank fainting epidemic begin; Israelis and Palestinians accuse each other of poison gas, but the cause is later determined mostly to be psychosomatic.
- 1985 – Canadian paraplegic athlete and humanitarian Rick Hansen begins his circumnavigation of the globe in a wheelchair in the name of spinal cord injury medical research.
- 1986 – Debi Thomas becomes the first African American to win the World Figure Skating Championships.
- 1989 – Transbrasil Flight 801 crashes into a slum near São Paulo/Guarulhos International Airport, killing 25 people.
- 1990 – Namibia becomes independent after 75 years of South African rule.
- 1994 – The United Nations Framework Convention on Climate Change enters into force.
- 1999 – Bertrand Piccard and Brian Jones become the first to circumnavigate the Earth in a hot air balloon.
- 2000 – Pope John Paul II makes his first ever pontifical visit to Israel.
- 2006 – The social media site Twitter (now officially named X) is founded.
- 2019 – The 2019 Xiangshui chemical plant explosion occurs, killing at least 47 people and injuring 640 others.
- 2022 – China Eastern Airlines Flight 5735 crashes in Guangxi, China, killing 132 people.

== Births ==
=== Pre-1600 ===
- 927 – Emperor Taizu of Song (died 976)
- 1474 – Angela Merici, Italian educator and saint (died 1540)
- 1501 – Anne Brooke, Baroness Cobham, English noble (died 1558)
- 1521 – Maurice, Elector of Saxony (died 1553)
- 1527 – Hermann Finck, German composer and educator (died 1558)
- 1555 – John Leveson, English politician (died 1615)
- 1557 – Anne Howard, Countess of Arundel, English countess and poet (died 1630)

=== 1601–1900 ===
- 1626 – Peter of Saint Joseph Betancur, Spanish saint and missionary (died 1667)
- 1672 – Stefano Benedetto Pallavicino, Italian poet and translator (died 1742)
- 1685 – Johann Sebastian Bach, German Baroque composer and musician (died 1750)
- 1713 – Francis Lewis, Welsh-American merchant and politician (died 1803)
- 1716 – Josef Seger, Bohemian organist, composer, and educator (died 1782)
- 1752 – Mary Dixon Kies, American inventor (died 1837)
- 1763 – Jean Paul, German journalist and author (died 1825)
- 1768 – Joseph Fourier, French mathematician and physicist (died 1830)
- 1779 – José Bernardo de Tagle y Portocarrero, Marquis of Torre Tagle, Peruvian soldier and politician, 2nd President of Peru (died 1825)
- 1802 – Augusta Waddington, Welsh writer and patron of the arts (died 1896)
- 1806 – Benito Juárez, Mexican lawyer and politician, 25th President of Mexico (died 1872)
- 1811 – Nathaniel Woodard, English priest and educator (died 1891)
- 1825 – Alexander Mozhaysky, Russian soldier and engineer (died 1890)
- 1831 – Dorothea Beale, English suffragist, educational reformer and author (died 1906)
- 1835 – Thomas Hayward, English cricketer (died 1876)
- 1839 – Modest Mussorgsky, Russian pianist and composer (died 1881)
- 1854 – Alick Bannerman, Australian cricketer and coach (died 1924)
- 1857 – Alice Henry, Australian journalist and activist (died 1943)
- 1859 – Daria Pratt, American golfer (died 1938)
- 1865 – George Owen Squier, American general and inventor of Musak (died 1934)
- 1866 – Antonia Maury, American astronomer and astrophysicist (died 1952)
- 1867 – Florenz Ziegfeld, Jr., American director and producer (died 1932)
- 1869 – David Robertson, Scottish-English golfer and rugby player (died 1937)
- 1874 – Alfred Tysoe, English runner (died 1901)
- 1876 – Walter Tewksbury, American runner and hurdler (died 1968)
- 1877 – Maurice Farman, French race car driver and pilot (died 1964)
- 1878 – Morris H. Whitehouse, American architect (died 1944)
- 1880 – Broncho Billy Anderson, American actor, director, and producer (died 1971)
- 1880 – Hans Hofmann, German-American painter and academic (died 1966)
- 1882 – Aleksander Kesküla, Estonian politician (died 1963)
- 1884 – George David Birkhoff, American mathematician (died 1944)
- 1885 – Pierre Renoir, French actor and director (died 1952)
- 1886 – Walter Dray, American pole vaulter (died 1973)
- 1887 – Clarice Beckett, Australian painter (died 1935)
- 1887 – Lajos Kassák, Hungarian poet, novelist and painter (died 1967)
- 1887 – M. N. Roy, Indian philosopher and politician (died 1954)
- 1889 – Jock Sutherland, American football player and coach (died 1948)
- 1894 – Hannah Ryggen, Norwegian textile artist (died 1970)
- 1896 – Friedrich Waismann, Austrian mathematician, physicist, and philosopher from the Vienna Circle (died 1959)
- 1897 – Sim Gokkes, Dutch composer and conductor (died 1943)
- 1897 – Salvador Lutteroth, Mexican wrestling promoter, founded Consejo Mundial de Lucha Libre (died 1987)
- 1899 – Panagiotis Pipinelis, Greek politician, Prime Minister of Greece (died 1970)

=== 1901–present ===
- 1901 – Karl Arnold, German businessman and politician, President of the German Bundesrat (died 1958)
- 1902 – Son House, American blues singer-songwriter and guitarist (died 1988)
- 1904 – Jehane Benoît, Canadian journalist and author (died 1987)
- 1904 – Forrest Mars, Sr., American candy maker, created M&M's and Mars bar (died 1999)
- 1904 – Nikos Skalkottas, Greek violinist and composer (died 1949)
- 1905 – Phyllis McGinley, American author and poet (died 1978)
- 1906 – André Filho, Brazilian musician and songwriter (died 1974)
- 1906 – John D. Rockefeller III, American philanthropist (died 1978)
- 1907 – Zoltán Kemény, Hungarian sculptor (died 1965)
- 1909 – Harry Lane, English footballer (died 1977)
- 1910 – Julio Gallo, American businessman, co-founded E & J Gallo Winery (died 1993)
- 1910 – Muhammad Siddiq Khan, Bangladeshi librarian and educator (died 1978)
- 1911 – Walter Lincoln Hawkins, American scientist and inventor (died 1992)
- 1912 – André Laurendeau, Canadian journalist, playwright, and politician (died 1968)
- 1913 – George Abecassis, English racing driver and pilot (died 1991)
- 1913 – Guillermo Haro, Mexican astronomer (died 1988)
- 1914 – Paul Tortelier, French cellist and composer (died 1990)
- 1916 – Bismillah Khan, Indian shehnai player (died 2006)
- 1917 – Frank Hardy, Australian journalist, author, and playwright (died 1994)
- 1918 – Patrick Lucey, American captain and politician, 38th Governor of Wisconsin (died 2014)
- 1920 – Manolis Chiotis, Greek singer-songwriter and bouzouki player (died 1970)
- 1920 – Éric Rohmer, French director, film critic, journalist, novelist and screenwriter (died 2010)
- 1921 – Arthur Grumiaux, Belgian violinist and pianist (died 1986)
- 1922 – Russ Meyer, American director, producer, and screenwriter (died 2004)
- 1923 – Louis-Edmond Hamelin, Canadian geographer, author, and academic (died 2020)
- 1923 – Rezső Nyers, Hungarian politician (died 2018)
- 1923 – Nizar Qabbani, Syrian poet, publisher, and diplomat (died 1998)
- 1923 – Nirmala Srivastava, Indian religious leader, founded Sahaja Yoga (died 2011)
- 1924 – Philip Abbott, American actor (died 1998)
- 1924 – Dov Shilansky, Lithuanian-Israeli lawyer and politician (died 2010)
- 1925 – Harold Ashby, American saxophonist (died 2003)
- 1925 – Peter Brook, English-French director and producer (died 2022)
- 1925 – Hugo Koblet, Swiss cyclist (died 1964)
- 1926 – André Delvaux, Belgian director and screenwriter (died 2002)
- 1927 – Halton Arp, American-German astronomer and critic (died 2013)
- 1927 – Hans-Dietrich Genscher, German soldier and politician, Vice-Chancellor of Germany (died 2016)
- 1928 – Surya Bahadur Thapa, Nepalese politician, 24th Prime Minister of Nepal (died 2015)
- 1929 – Maurice Catarcio, American wrestler (died 2005)
- 1930 – James Coco, American actor (died 1987)
- 1930 – Otis Spann, American blues pianist, singer and composer (died 1970)
- 1931 – Clark L. Brundin, American-English engineer and academic (died 2021)
- 1931 – Catherine Gibson, Scottish swimmer (died 2013)
- 1931 – Toyonobori, Japanese sumo wrestler (died 1998)
- 1931 – Al Williamson, American illustrator (died 2010)
- 1932 – Walter Gilbert, American physicist and chemist, Nobel Prize laureate
- 1932 – Joseph Silverstein, American violinist and conductor (died 2015)
- 1933 – John Hall, English businessman
- 1933 – Michael Heseltine, Welsh businessman and politician, Deputy Prime Minister of the United Kingdom
- 1934 – Al Freeman, Jr., American actor and director (died 2012)
- 1935 – Brian Clough, English footballer and manager (died 2004)
- 1936 – Ed Broadbent, Canadian political scientist and politician (died 2024)
- 1936 – Mike Westbrook, English pianist and composer (died 2026)
- 1937 – Ann Clwyd, Welsh journalist and politician, Shadow Secretary of State for Wales (died 2023)
- 1937 – Tom Flores, American football player and coach
- 1937 – Pierre-Jean Rémy, French diplomat and author (died 2010)
- 1938 – Michael Foreman, English author and illustrator
- 1938 – Grahame Thomas, Australian cricketer
- 1939 – Kathleen Widdoes, American actress
- 1940 – Solomon Burke, American singer-songwriter (died 2010)
- 1940 – Andrea Elle, German bicyclist
- 1940 – Chip Taylor, American singer and songwriter (died 2026)
- 1942 – Françoise Dorléac, French actress (died 1967)
- 1942 – Amina Claudine Myers, American singer-songwriter and pianist
- 1942 – Kostas Politis, Greek basketball player and coach (died 2018)
- 1942 – Patcha Ramachandra Rao, Indian metallurgist, educator and administrator (died 2010)
- 1943 – István Gyulai, Hungarian sprinter and sportscaster (died 2006)
- 1943 – Hartmut Haenchen, German conductor
- 1943 – Vivian Stanshall, English singer-songwriter, guitarist, and painter (died 1995)
- 1944 – Marie-Christine Barrault, French actress
- 1944 – Janet Daley, American-English journalist and author
- 1944 – Hideki Ishima, Japanese guitarist
- 1944 – Mike Jackson, English general (died 2024)
- 1944 – David Lindley, American guitarist, songwriter, and producer (died 2023)
- 1945 – Anthony Grabiner, Baron Grabiner, English lawyer
- 1945 – Charles Greene, American sprinter and coach (died 2022)
- 1945 – Rose Stone, American singer-songwriter and keyboard player
- 1946 – Timothy Dalton, Welsh-English actor
- 1946 – Ray Dorset, English singer-songwriter and guitarist
- 1946 – Joseph Mitsuaki Takami, Japanese cardinal
- 1947 – George Johnston, Scottish footballer
- 1948 – Scott Fahlman, American computer scientist and academic
- 1949 – Alvin Kallicharran, Guyanese cricketer and coach
- 1949 – Andy Love, Scottish-English politician
- 1949 – Eddie Money, American singer-songwriter and guitarist (died 2019)
- 1949 – Slavoj Žižek, Slovenian sociologist, philosopher, and academic
- 1950 – Roger Hodgson, English singer-songwriter and keyboard player
- 1950 – Sergey Lavrov, Russian politician and diplomat, Russian Minister of Foreign Affairs
- 1950 – Ron Oden, American minister and politician, 19th Mayor of Palm Springs
- 1951 – Conrad Lozano, American bass player
- 1951 – Russell Thompkins Jr., American singer-songwriter
- 1953 – Steve Furber, English computer scientist and academic
- 1953 – Paul Martin Lester, American photographer, author, and educator (died 2023)
- 1953 – David Wisniewski, English-American author and illustrator (died 2002)
- 1954 – Prayut Chan-o-cha, Thai politician, Prime Minister of Thailand
- 1954 – Mike Dunleavy Sr., American basketball player, coach, and executive
- 1954 – Steve Sheppard, American basketball player
- 1955 – Fadi Abboud, Lebanese economist and politician
- 1955 – Bob Bennett, American singer-songwriter and guitarist
- 1955 – Jair Bolsonaro, Brazilian politician and retired military officer, 38th President of Brazil
- 1955 – Dimitrios Papadimoulis, Greek politician
- 1955 – Bärbel Wöckel, German sprinter
- 1956 – Dick Beardsley, American runner
- 1956 – Guy Chadwick, German-English singer-songwriter and guitarist
- 1956 – Richard H. Kirk, English guitarist, keyboard player, composer, and producer (died 2021)
- 1956 – Ingrid Kristiansen, Norwegian runner
- 1958 – Marlies Göhr, German sprinter
- 1958 – Brad Hall, American comedian, director, and screenwriter
- 1958 – Gary Oldman, English actor, filmmaker, musician, and author
- 1959 – Sarah Jane Morris, English singer-songwriter
- 1959 – Yuval Rotem, Israeli diplomat
- 1959 – Nobuo Uematsu, Japanese keyboard player and composer
- 1960 – Benito T. de Leon, Filipino general
- 1960 – Marwan Farhat, Syrian actor and voice actor
- 1960 – Raivo Puusepp, Estonian architect
- 1960 – Ayrton Senna, Brazilian race car driver (died 1994)
- 1960 – Robert Sweet, American drummer and producer
- 1961 – Kassie DePaiva, American actress
- 1961 – Lothar Matthäus, German footballer and manager
- 1961 – Gary O'Reilly, English footballer
- 1961 – Kim Turner, American hurdler
- 1962 – Farahnaz Bahrami, Norwegian politician
- 1962 – Matthew Broderick, American actor
- 1962 – Kathy Greenwood, Canadian actress and screenwriter
- 1962 – Rosie O'Donnell, American actress, producer, and talk show host
- 1962 – Mark Waid, American author
- 1963 – Shawon Dunston, American baseball player
- 1963 – Ronald Koeman, Dutch footballer and manager
- 1963 – Shawn Lane, American guitarist, songwriter, and producer (died 2003)
- 1963 – Share Pedersen, American bass player
- 1964 – Ieuan Evans, Welsh rugby player
- 1964 – Jesper Skibby, Danish cyclist
- 1965 – Xavier Bertrand, French businessman and politician, French Minister of Social Affairs
- 1965 – Thomas Frank, American author, historian and political analyst
- 1965 – Cynthia Geary, American actress
- 1966 – Benito Archundia, Mexican footballer, referee, lawyer, and economist
- 1966 – Hauke Fuhlbrügge, German runner
- 1966 – Al Iafrate, American ice hockey player
- 1966 – Moa Matthis, Swedish author
- 1966 – Matthew Maynard, English cricketer and coach
- 1966 – DJ Premier, American DJ and producer
- 1967 – Jonas Berggren, Swedish singer-songwriter, musician, and producer
- 1967 – Carwyn Jones, Welsh lawyer and politician, First Minister of Wales
- 1967 – Maxim, English musician and songwriter
- 1967 – Mirela Rupic, American costume and fashion designer
- 1968 – Cameron Clyne, Australian businessman
- 1968 – Andrew Copeland, American singer and musician
- 1968 – Greg Ellis, English actor, producer, and screenwriter
- 1968 – Johan Garpenlöv, Swedish ice hockey player
- 1968 – Tolunay Kafkas, Turkish footballer and manager
- 1968 – Gary Walsh, English footballer and coach
- 1968 – Scott Williams, American basketball player and sportscaster
- 1969 – Jonah Goldberg, American journalist and author
- 1970 – Shiho Niiyama, Japanese voice actress (died 2000)
- 1970 – Cenk Uygur, Turkish-American political activist
- 1971 – Zsolt Kürtösi, Hungarian decathlete
- 1972 – Chris Candido, American wrestler (died 2005)
- 1972 – Balázs Kiss, Hungarian hammer thrower
- 1972 – Boris Mironov, Russian ice hockey player
- 1972 – Derartu Tulu, Ethiopian runner
- 1972 – Graeme Welch, English cricketer
- 1973 – Ananda Lewis, American television host (died 2025)
- 1973 – Stuart Nethercott, English footballer and manager
- 1973 – Large Professor, American rapper and producer
- 1974 – Laura Allen, American actress
- 1974 – Rhys Darby, New Zealand comedian and actor
- 1974 – Dejima Takeharu, Japanese sumo wrestler
- 1975 – Michale Graves, American singer-songwriter
- 1975 – Corné Krige, South African rugby player
- 1975 – Fabricio Oberto, Argentinian-Italian basketball player
- 1975 – Vitaly Potapenko, Ukrainian basketball player and coach
- 1975 – Mark Williams, Welsh snooker player
- 1976 – Rachael MacFarlane, American voice actress and singer
- 1976 – Bamboo Mañalac, Filipino singer-songwriter and guitarist
- 1976 – Tekin Sazlog, German-Turkish footballer
- 1977 – Bruno Cirillo, Italian footballer
- 1977 – Jamie Delgado, English tennis player
- 1978 – Sally Barsosio, Kenyan runner
- 1978 – Charmaine Dragun, Australian journalist (died 2007)
- 1978 – Kevin Federline, American dancer and television personality
- 1978 – Cristian Guzmán, Dominican baseball player
- 1978 – Joyce Jimenez, Filipino movie and TV actress
- 1978 – Mohammad Rezaei, Iranian wrestler
- 1980 – Goran Bezina, Swiss ice hockey player
- 1980 – Marit Bjørgen, Norwegian skier
- 1980 – Lee Jin, South Korean singer and actress
- 1980 – Ronaldinho, Brazilian footballer
- 1980 – Deryck Whibley, Canadian singer-songwriter, guitarist, and producer
- 1981 – Sébastien Chavanel, French cyclist
- 1981 – Germano, Brazilian footballer
- 1982 – Maria Elena Camerin, Italian tennis player
- 1982 – Ejegayehu Dibaba, Ethiopian runner
- 1982 – Colin Turkington, Northern Irish racing driver
- 1983 – Jean Ondoa, Cameroonian footballer
- 1983 – Lucila Pascua, Spanish basketball player
- 1984 – Tarence Kinsey, American basketball player
- 1984 – Guillermo Daniel Rodríguez, Uruguayan footballer
- 1985 – Ryan Callahan, American ice hockey player
- 1985 – Sonequa Martin-Green, American actress
- 1985 – Adrian Peterson, American football player
- 1986 – Romanos Alyfantis, Greek swimmer
- 1986 – Scott Eastwood, American actor
- 1986 – Nikoleta Kyriakopoulou, Greek pole vaulter
- 1986 – Michu, Spanish footballer
- 1987 – Carlos Carrasco, Venezuelan baseball pitcher
- 1988 – Solomon Alabi, Nigerian basketball player
- 1988 – Kateřina Čechová, Czech sprinter
- 1988 – Erik Johnson, American ice hockey player
- 1988 – Michael Madl, Austrian footballer
- 1989 – Jordi Alba, Spanish footballer
- 1989 – Nicolás Lodeiro, Uruguayan footballer
- 1989 – Takeru Satoh, Japanese actor
- 1990 – Mandy Capristo, German singer-songwriter and dancer
- 1990 – Darius Miller, American basketball player
- 1991 – Luke Chapman, English footballer
- 1991 – Antoine Griezmann, French footballer
- 1992 – Lehlogonolo Masalesa, South African footballer
- 1992 – Chiney Ogwumike, American basketball player
- 1992 – Karolína Plíšková, Czech tennis player
- 1992 – Kristýna Plíšková, Czech tennis player
- 1993 – Sven Andrighetto, Swiss ice hockey player
- 1993 – Jake Bidwell, English footballer
- 1993 – Jesse Joronen, Finnish footballer
- 1993 – Frankie Montas, Dominican baseball player
- 1994 – Jasmin Savoy Brown, American actress
- 1995 – RJ Cyler, American actor
- 1995 – Nick Mullens, American football player
- 1995 – Mirco Müller, Swiss ice hockey player
- 1996 – Aurora Mikalsen, Norwegian footballer
- 1997 – Nat Phillips, English footballer
- 1997 – Martina Stoessel, Argentine singer and actress
- 1998 – Miles Bridges, American basketball player
- 2000 – Jace Norman, American actor
- 2000 – Yoon San-ha, South Korean singer and actor
- 2003 – Abbi Pulling, English racing driver
- 2007 – Ethan Nwaneri, English footballer

== Deaths ==
=== Pre-1600 ===
- 543 or 547 – Benedict of Nursia, Italian saint (born 480)
- 867 – Ælla, king of Northumbria
- 867 – Osberht, king of Northumbria
- 1034 – Ezzo, Count Palatine of Lotharingia (born 955)
- 1063 – Richeza of Lotharingia (born 995)
- 1076 – Robert I, Duke of Burgundy (born 1011)
- 1201 – Absalon, Danish archbishop (born c. 1128)
- 1306 – Robert II, Duke of Burgundy (born 1248)
- 1372 – Rudolf VI, Margrave of Baden
- 1487 – Nicholas of Flüe, Swiss monk and saint (born 1417)
- 1540 – John de Vere, 15th Earl of Oxford, English peer and courtier (born c. 1482)
- 1556 – Thomas Cranmer, English archbishop (born 1489)
- 1571 – Odet de Coligny, French cardinal and Protestant (born 1517)

=== 1601–1900 ===
- 1617 – Pocahontas, Algonquian Indigenous woman (born c. 1595)
- 1653 – Tarhoncu Ahmed Pasha, Albanian politician, Grand Vizier of the Ottoman Empire
- 1656 – James Ussher, Irish archbishop (born 1581)
- 1676 – Henri Sauval, French historian and author (born 1623)
- 1729 – John Law, Scottish-French economist and politician, Controller-General of Finances (born 1671)
- 1729 – Elżbieta Sieniawska, politically influential Polish magnate (born 1669)
- 1734 – Robert Wodrow, Scottish historian and author (born 1679)
- 1751 – Johann Heinrich Zedler, German publisher (born 1706)
- 1752 – Gio Nicola Buhagiar, Maltese painter (born 1698)
- 1762 – Nicolas Louis de Lacaille, French priest, astronomer, and academic (born 1713)
- 1772 – Jacques-Nicolas Bellin, French geographer and cartographer (born 1703)
- 1795 – Giovanni Arduino, Italian miner and geologist (born 1714)
- 1801 – Andrea Luchesi, Italian composer and educator (born 1741)
- 1804 – Louis Antoine, Duke of Enghien (born 1772)
- 1843 – Robert Southey, English poet, historian, and translator (born 1774)
- 1843 – Guadalupe Victoria, Mexican general and politician, 1st President of Mexico (born 1786)
- 1854 – Pedro María de Anaya, Mexican soldier. President (1847-1848) (born 1795)
- 1863 – Edwin Vose Sumner, American general (born 1797)
- 1869 – Juan Almonte, son of José María Morelos, was a Mexican soldier and diplomat who served as a regent in the Second Mexican Empire (1863-1864) (born 1803)
- 1884 – Ezra Abbot, American scholar and academic (born 1819)
- 1891 – Joseph E. Johnston, American general (born 1807)
- 1892 – Annibale de Gasparis, Italian astronomer (born 1819)

=== 1901–present ===
- 1915 – Frederick Winslow Taylor, American golfer, tennis player, and engineer (born 1856)
- 1920 – Evelina Haverfield, British suffragette and aid worker (born 1867)
- 1927 – Thomas Oikonomou, Greek actor (born 1864)
- 1933 – Enrico D'Ovidio, Italian mathematician (born 1842)
- 1934 – Franz Schreker, Austrian composer and conductor (born 1878)
- 1934 – Lilyan Tashman, American actress (born 1896)
- 1936 – Alexander Glazunov, Russian composer and conductor (born 1865)
- 1939 – Evald Aav, Estonian composer and conductor (born 1900)
- 1939 – Ali Hikmet Ayerdem, Turkish general and politician (born 1877)
- 1943 – Cornelia Fort, American soldier and pilot (born 1919)
- 1945 – Arthur Nebe, German SS officer (born 1894)
- 1946 – Henry Hanna, Irish Judge, photographer and author (born 1871)
- 1951 – Willem Mengelberg, Dutch conductor and composer (born 1871)
- 1953 – Ed Voss, American basketball player (born 1922)
- 1956 – Hatı Çırpan, Turkish politician (born 1890)
- 1958 – Cyril M. Kornbluth, American soldier and author (born 1923)
- 1970 – Manolis Chiotis, Greek singer-songwriter and bouzouki player (born 1920)
- 1975 – Joe Medwick, American baseball player and coach (born 1911)
- 1978 – Cearbhall Ó Dálaigh, President of Ireland (born 1911)
- 1980 – Peter Stoner, American mathematician and astronomer (born 1888)
- 1985 – Michael Redgrave, English actor, director, and manager (born 1908)
- 1987 – Walter L. Gordon, Canadian accountant, lawyer, and politician, 22nd Canadian Minister of Finance (born 1906)
- 1987 – Robert Preston, American captain, actor, and singer (born 1918)
- 1991 – Vedat Dalokay, Turkish architect and politician, Mayor of Ankara (born 1927)
- 1991 – Leo Fender, American businessman, founded Fender Musical Instruments Corporation (born 1909)
- 1992 – John Ireland, Canadian-American actor and director (born 1914)
- 1992 – Natalie Sleeth, American pianist and composer (born 1930)
- 1994 – Macdonald Carey, American actor (born 1913)
- 1994 – Lili Damita, French-American actress and singer (born 1904)
- 1994 – Aleksandrs Laime, Latvian-born explorer (born 1911)
- 1997 – Wilbert Awdry, English cleric and author, created The Railway Series, the basis for Thomas the Tank Engine (born 1911)
- 1998 – Galina Ulanova, Russian ballerina (born 1910)
- 1999 – Jean Guitton, French philosopher and author (born 1905)
- 1999 – Ernie Wise, English comedian and actor (born 1925)
- 2001 – Chung Ju-yung, South Korean businessman, founded Hyundai (born 1915)
- 2001 – Anthony Steel, English actor and singer (born 1920)
- 2002 – Herman Talmadge, American lieutenant, lawyer, and politician, 70th Governor of Georgia (born 1913)
- 2003 – Shivani, Indian author (born 1923)
- 2003 – Umar Wirahadikusumah, Indonesian general and politician, 4th Vice President of Indonesia (born 1924)
- 2004 – Ludmilla Tchérina, French actress, dancer, and choreographer (born 1924)
- 2005 – Barney Martin, American police officer and actor (born 1923)
- 2005 – Bobby Short, American singer and pianist (born 1924)
- 2007 – Drew Hayes, American author and illustrator (born 1969)
- 2007 – Sven O. Høiby, Norwegian hurdler and journalist (born 1936)
- 2008 – Denis Cosgrove, English-American geographer and academic (born 1948)
- 2008 – Guillermo Jullian de la Fuente, Chilean architect and academic (born 1931)
- 2008 – John List, American murderer (born 1925)
- 2009 – Mohit Sharma, Indian army officer (born 1978)
- 2009 – Walt Poddubny, Canadian ice hockey player and coach (born 1960)
- 2010 – Wolfgang Wagner, German director and manager (born 1919)
- 2011 – Loleatta Holloway, American singer-songwriter (born 1946)
- 2011 – Gerd Klier, German footballer (born 1944)
- 2011 – Ladislav Novák, Czech footballer and manager (born 1931)
- 2011 – Pinetop Perkins, American singer and pianist (born 1913)
- 2012 – Albrecht Dietz, German economist and businessman (born 1926)
- 2012 – Ron Erhardt, American football player and coach (born 1931)
- 2012 – Robert Fuest, English director, screenwriter, and production designer (born 1927)
- 2012 – Tonino Guerra, Italian poet and screenwriter (born 1920)
- 2012 – Irving Louis Horowitz, American sociologist, author, and academic (born 1929)
- 2012 – Yuri Razuvaev, Russian chess player and trainer (born 1945)
- 2012 – Marina Salye, Russian geologist and politician (born 1934)
- 2013 – Chinua Achebe, Nigerian novelist, poet, and critic (born 1930)
- 2013 – Rick Hautala, American author and screenwriter (born 1949)
- 2013 – Harlon Hill, American football player and coach (born 1932)
- 2013 – Pietro Mennea, Italian sprinter and politician (born 1952)
- 2013 – Giancarlo Zagni, Italian director and screenwriter (born 1926)
- 2014 – Qoriniasi Bale, Fijian lawyer and politician, 25th Attorney-General of Fiji (born 1929)
- 2014 – Bill Boedeker, American football player and soldier (born 1924)
- 2014 – Jack Fleck, American golfer (born 1921)
- 2014 – Simeon Oduoye, Nigerian police officer and politician (born 1945)
- 2014 – James Rebhorn, American actor (born 1948)
- 2014 – Ignatius Zakka I Iwas, Iraqi patriarch (born 1933)
- 2015 – Ishaya Bakut, Nigerian general and politician, Governor of Benue State (born 1947)
- 2015 – Chuck Bednarik, American lieutenant and football player (born 1925)
- 2015 – James C. Binnicker, American sergeant (born 1938)
- 2015 – Hans Erni, Swiss painter, sculptor, and illustrator (born 1909)
- 2015 – Jørgen Ingmann, Danish singer and guitarist (born 1925)
- 2015 – Alberta Watson, Canadian actress (born 1955)
- 2017 – Chuck Barris, American game show host and producer (born 1929)
- 2017 – Colin Dexter, English author (born 1930)
- 2017 – Martin McGuinness, Irish republican and deputy First Minister of Northern Ireland (born 1950)
- 2017 – Mike Hall, British cyclist (born 1981)
- 2019 – Victor Hochhauser CBE, British music promoter (born 1923)
- 2019 – Gonzalo Portocarrero, Peruvian sociologist (born 1949)
- 2021 – Nawal El Saadawi, Egyptian secularist, feminist (born 1931)
- 2023 – Willis Reed, American basketball player (born 1942)
- 2025 – Kitty Dukakis, American author, First Lady of Massachusetts (born 1936)
- 2025 – George Foreman, American boxer, actor, and businessman (born 1949)
- 2026 – Michael Lyster, Irish radio and television broadcaster (born 1954)
- 2026 – Rhoda Roberts, Australian arts executive (born 1959)

== Holidays and observances ==
- Arbor Day (Lesotho)
- Arbor Day (Portugal)
- Christian feast day:
  - Augustine Zhao Rong
  - Benedetta Cambiagio Frassinello
  - Passing of Saint Benedict (Order of Saint Benedict, pre-1970 Calendar)
  - Birillus
  - Enda of Aran
  - Nicholas of Flüe
  - Serapion of Thmuis
  - Thomas Cranmer (Anglicanism)
  - March 21 (Eastern Orthodox liturgics)
- Early music
- Education Freedom Day
- Harmony Day (Australia)
- Human Rights Day (South Africa)
- Independence Day (Namibia)
- International Colour Day (International)
- International Day for the Elimination of Racial Discrimination (International)
- International Day of Forests (International), by proclamation of the United Nations General Assembly
- Mother's Day (most of the Arab world)
- Natalicio de Benito Juárez, one of Fiestas Patrias (Mexico)
- Oltenia Day (Romania)
- Rosie the Riveter Day (United States)
- Truant's Day (Poland, Faroe Islands)
- Vernal equinox related observances (see also March 20)
- World Day for Glaciers (International)
- World Down Syndrome Day (International)
- World Poetry Day (International)
- World Puppetry Day (International)
- Youth Day (Tunisia)
