= Digital Freedom Foundation =

- Abbreviation: DFF
- Formation: 2004; 22 years ago
- Type: Advocacy organization
- Website: digitalfreedoms.org

Digital Freedom Foundation (DFF) is a non-profit organization established in 2004. The group is the lead organizer of Software Freedom Day, and Hardware Freedom Day, as well as other "digital freedom days".

== History ==
The organization was founded in 2004 as Software Freedom International, and formally registered as a charity in 2007. In 2011, the group changed its name to the "Digital Freedom Foundation" to reflect the creation of additional "freedom days" celebrating culture, hardware, and education.

In 2015, the DFF became responsible for organizing the annual Document Freedom Day, which was initially started by the Free Software Foundation Europe. The DFF had received tax-empt status in the United States under its original name in order to make donations tax-deductible. Since then, the organization moved to Hong Kong before registering in Cambodia following the relocation of several board members.

As of 2023, the Digital Freedom Foundation is legally harboured under the Earth Cause Public Charity allowing donations in the US to be tax-deductible.

=== Events ===
The Digital Freedom Foundation organizes the following "freedom day" events:

- Software Freedom Day (third Saturday in September)
- Document Freedom Day (last Wednesday of March)
- Hardware Freedom Day (third Saturday in April)

In the past, they also organized the following events:

- Education Freedom Day (third Saturday in January)
- Culture Freedom Day (third Saturday in May)

== Board members ==
=== Current board ===
- Laura Michaels, USA (since June 2023)
- Ruwan Ranganath, Germany (since June 2023)
- Jan Husar, Slovakia (since June 2023)
- Chris Valachovic, Germany (since April 2024)
- Jurgen Gaeremyn, Belgium (since June 2023)
- Paul Harrie, Philippines (since March 2026)

=== Past board members ===
- Matt Oquist (2004 - 2012?)
- JM C. Bitanga
- Quiliro Ordóñez
- Silvia Aimasso
- Alexjan Carraturo
- Pia Waugh (President), of Linux Australia (2004 - 2009)
- Henrik Nilsen Omma of TheOpenCD project (2004-2006 - founding member)
- Phil Harper, of TheOpenCD project
- Benjamin Mako Hill, of the Free Software Foundation (2006)
- Sidsel Jensen, DKUUG (2004-2006)
- Frederick Noronha, Goa SFD Team (2006)
- Joe Olutuase, of Knowledge House Africa
- Robert Schumann, of TheOpenCD project
- Frederic Muller (2011-2023)
- Pockey Lam (2011-2023)
- Julien Forgeat (2011-2023)
- Patrick Sinz (2011- † 2019)
- Mostafa Ahangarha, Iran (2023 - 2025)
- Marcos Marado, Portugal (2023 - 2026)

== See also ==
- Public Domain Day
- International Day Against DRM, organized under the Defective by Design campaign
