= Linux Tour =

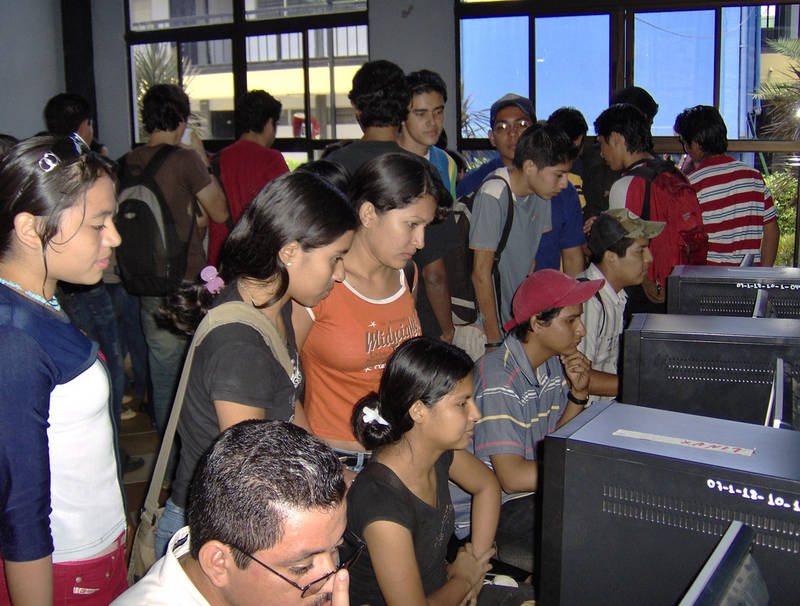
A Linux Tour event in the Universidad Nacional de Ingeniería (UNI) in Managua, Nicaragua.

Linux Tour is an ongoing tour of Linux and FOSS related conferences and events held in major Nicaraguan Universities and schools.

== History ==
The first Linux Tour event was held in Managua, Nicaragua, in the Instituto de Estudios Superiores (IES), on June 4, 2007. The first edition of the Linux Tour 2007 had a total of eight events in the cities of Managua and León.

The Linux Tour was initially an initiative of the Nicaraguan Ubuntu LoCo Team. Today, all the major Nicaraguan LUGs are part of the LinuxTour.org organization, which is also responsible for organizing other major events in Nicaragua, such as FLISOL, Document Freedom Day and the Software Freedom Day.

This initiative was recognized by Linux Journal making reference to it in an article.

In February 2009, the Linux Tour went international, with two events scheduled in Tegucigalpa and San Pedro Sula, Honduras. The Nicaraguan Linux Tour events inspired similar initiatives in the region, such as the Ubuntu Tour in Honduras, Café Libre in Guatemala and Pizza Bash, a more informal event, in Nicaragua.
