= Education Freedom Day =

Education Freedom Day logo

Education Freedom Day (EFD) is an international event launched by the Digital Freedom Foundation in 2013. It's annually observed on March 21. It is similar to other Freedom Days, namely Software, Hardware and Culture Freedom Day. The goal of EDF is spread knowledge and awareness regarding the benefits of using free software and free educational resources for education.

== History ==
The first Education Freedom Day was observed on January 17, 2013. The date, however, had to later be changed due to incompatibilities with local holidays such as Chinese New Year and summer holidays when schools are closed. Presently it is observed in March. In 2016, EFD was observed on March 21.

Event organization is handled by DFF and volunteers around the world. Volunteers are encouraged to organize events that benefit local educational communities.
