= Klier =

Klier is a surname. Notable people with the surname include:

- Andreas Klier (born 1976), German road racing cyclist
- Cornelia Klier (born 1957), German rower
- Freya Klier (born 1950), German author and film director
- Gerd Klier (1944–2011) German footballer
- John Klier (1944–2007), American historian
- Leo Klier (1923–2005), American basketball player
- Philip Adolphe Klier (1845–1911) German photographer in colonial British-Burma
- Richard Klier (1891–?), Czech Olympic sports shooter
