= International Day Against DRM =

Protests against digital rights management technology

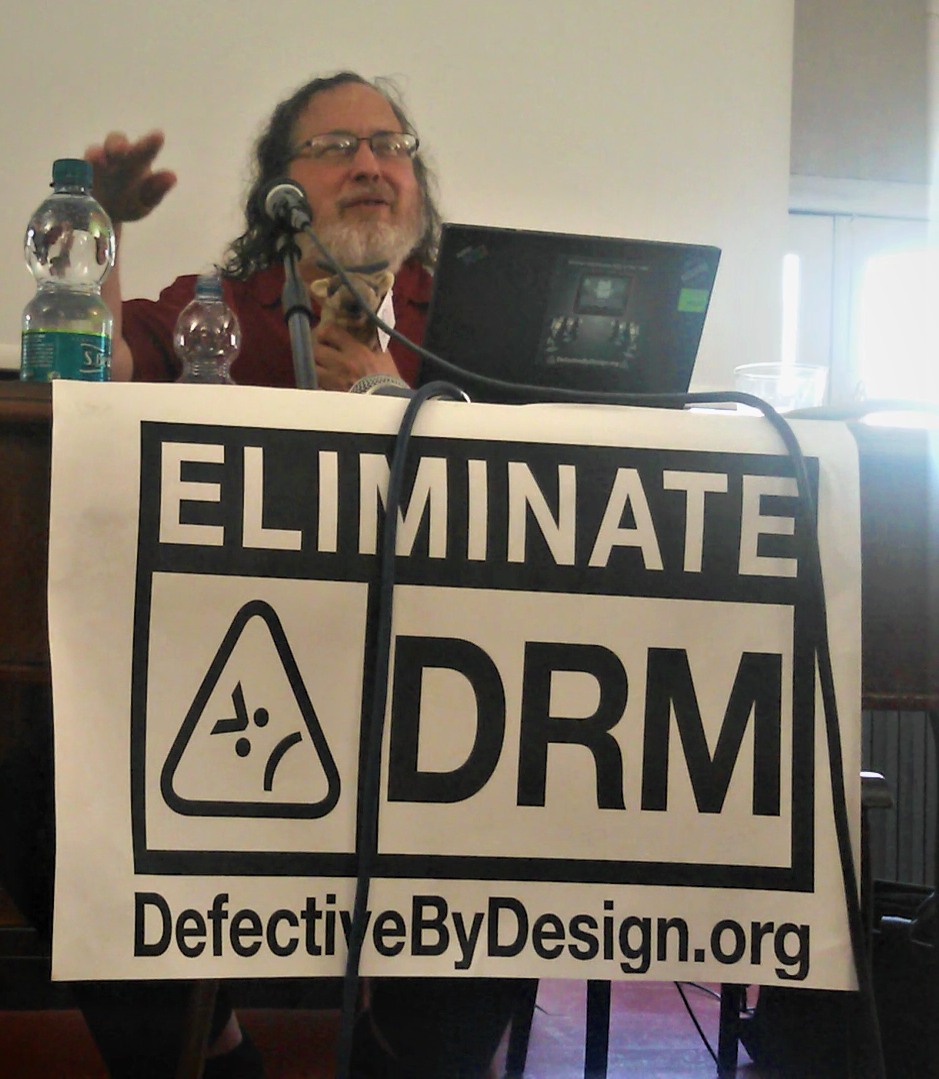
- Richard Stallman during the 2017 International Day Against DRM in Genoa
- Status: active
- Genre: Educational activities and activist demonstrations and happenings
- Frequency: Annually
- Inaugurated: 2006
- Founder: Defective by Design / Free Software Foundation
- Patron: Defective by Design / Free Software Foundation
- Website: www.dayagainstdrm.org

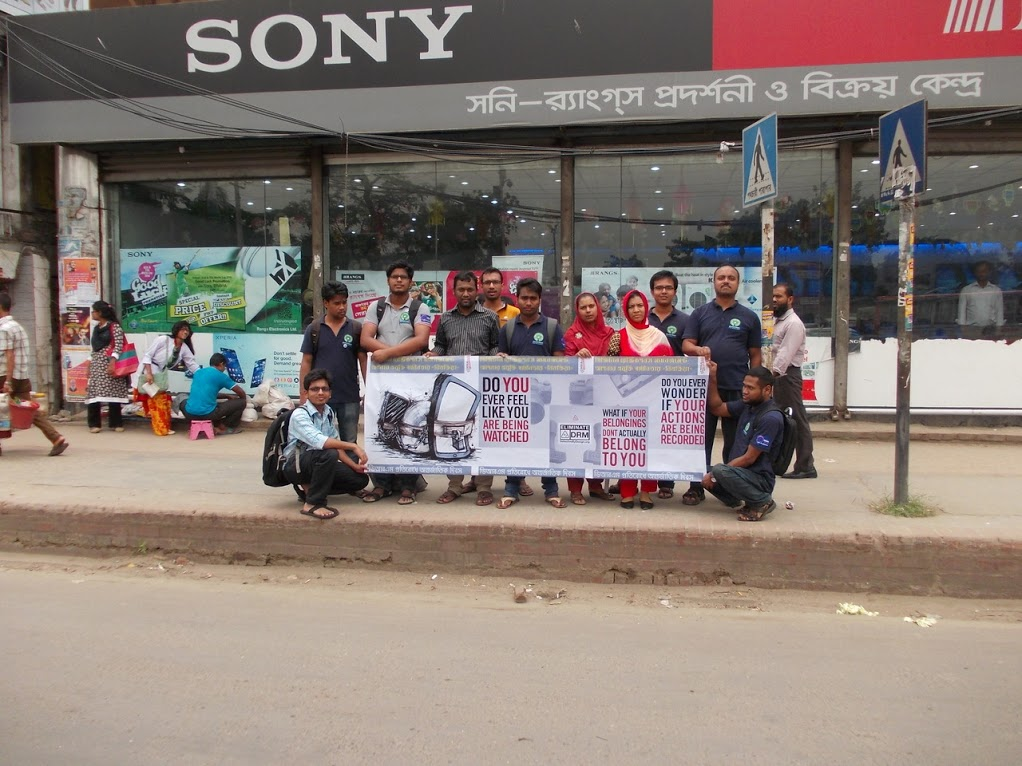
Activists protesting Sony's DRM restrictions in Dhaka on the 2016 Day Against DRM

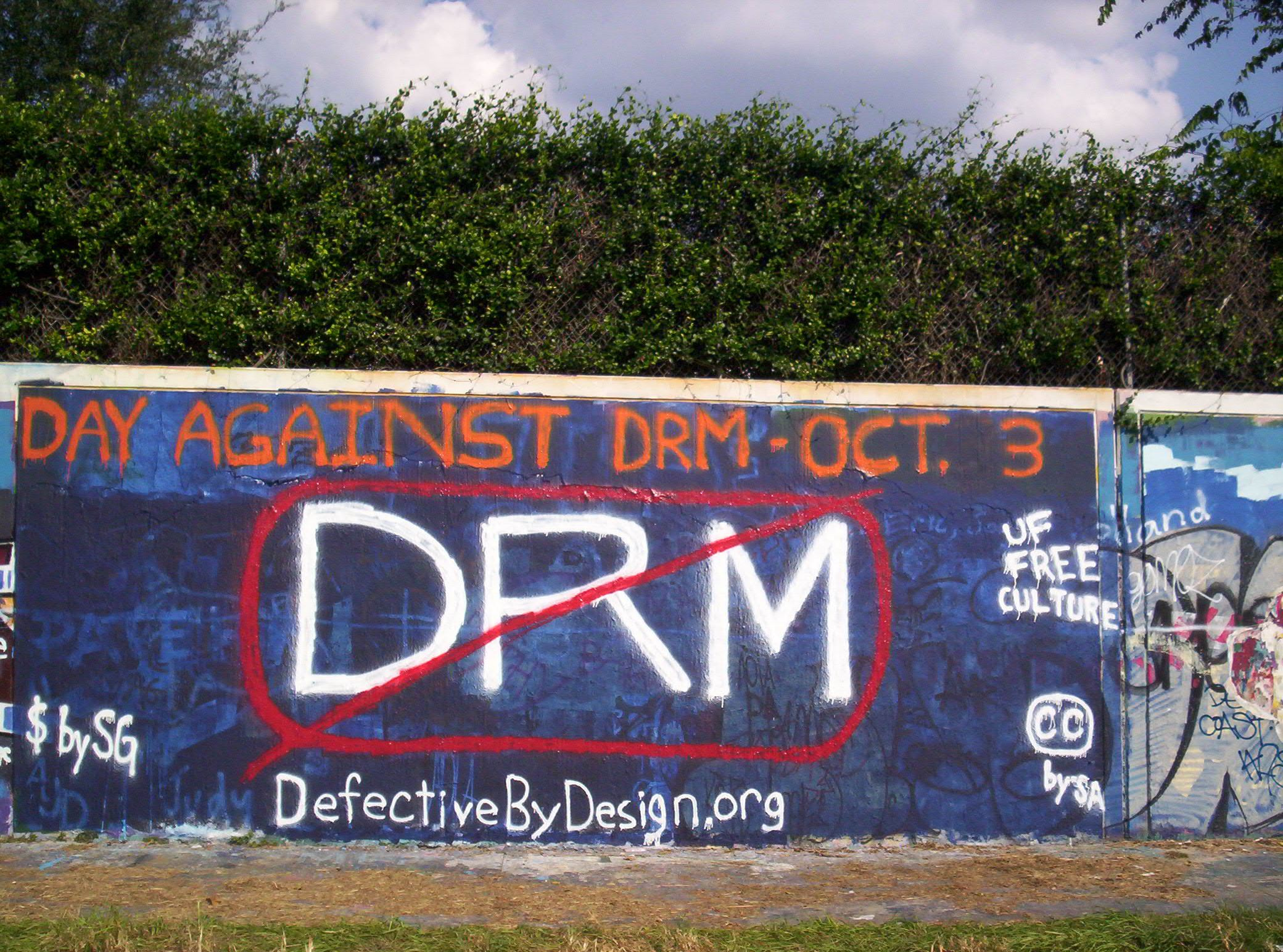
Day Against DRM graffiti in 2006 in Florida

International Day Against DRM (IDAD), sometimes called just Day Against DRM or anti-DRM day, is a grassroots international observance of protests against digital rights management (DRM, also known as "digital restrictions management") technology. The event is intended as "a counterpoint to the pro-DRM message broadcast by powerful media and software companies" and aims to draw attention to DRM's anti-consumer aspects.

== Background ==
International Day Against DRM has been also described as a reaction against the lobbyist-dominated World Intellectual Property Day of the World Intellectual Property Organization, which promotes DRM. World Intellectual Property Day has been criticized by the activists from civil society organizations such as IP Justice and the Electronic Information for Libraries who consider it one-sided propaganda as the marketing materials associated with the event, provided by WIPO, "come across as unrepresentative of other views and events". Michael Geist, a law professor at the University of Ottawa, noted that "World Intellectual Property Day has become little more than a lobbyist day".

== Activism ==
This recurring event has been organized annually since 2006, and has been first introduced by the Defective by Design initiative. Various activities related to the event happen around the world, organized by anti-DRM grassroots activists and organizations. During the International Day Against DRM, there are discussions and promotions of DRM-free media and technology. Consumers are encouraged to switch to DRM-free alternatives. Companies that agree with the criticism of DRM have been known to offer discounts on products like DRM-free ebooks. In 2008 Defective by Design announced 35 consecutive Days Against DRM, each one warning the public against a different DRM-related product or service.

This event has been endorsed by a number of civil society organizations such as the Free Software Foundation (creator of the Defective by Design initiative), Creative Commons, the Document Foundation, the Electronic Freedom Foundation, the Open Rights Group, Public Knowledge, and companies like O'Reilly Media, iFixit and Packt.

== See also ==
- Culture Freedom Day
- Document Freedom Day
- Hardware Freedom Day
- Public Domain Day
- Software Freedom Day
