= The Public Domain Review =

Online magazine

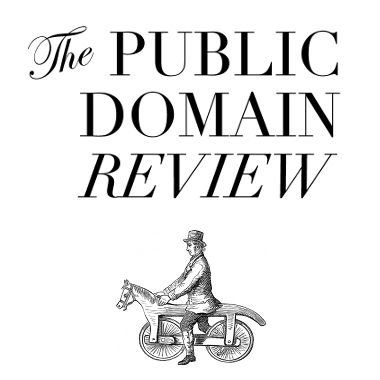

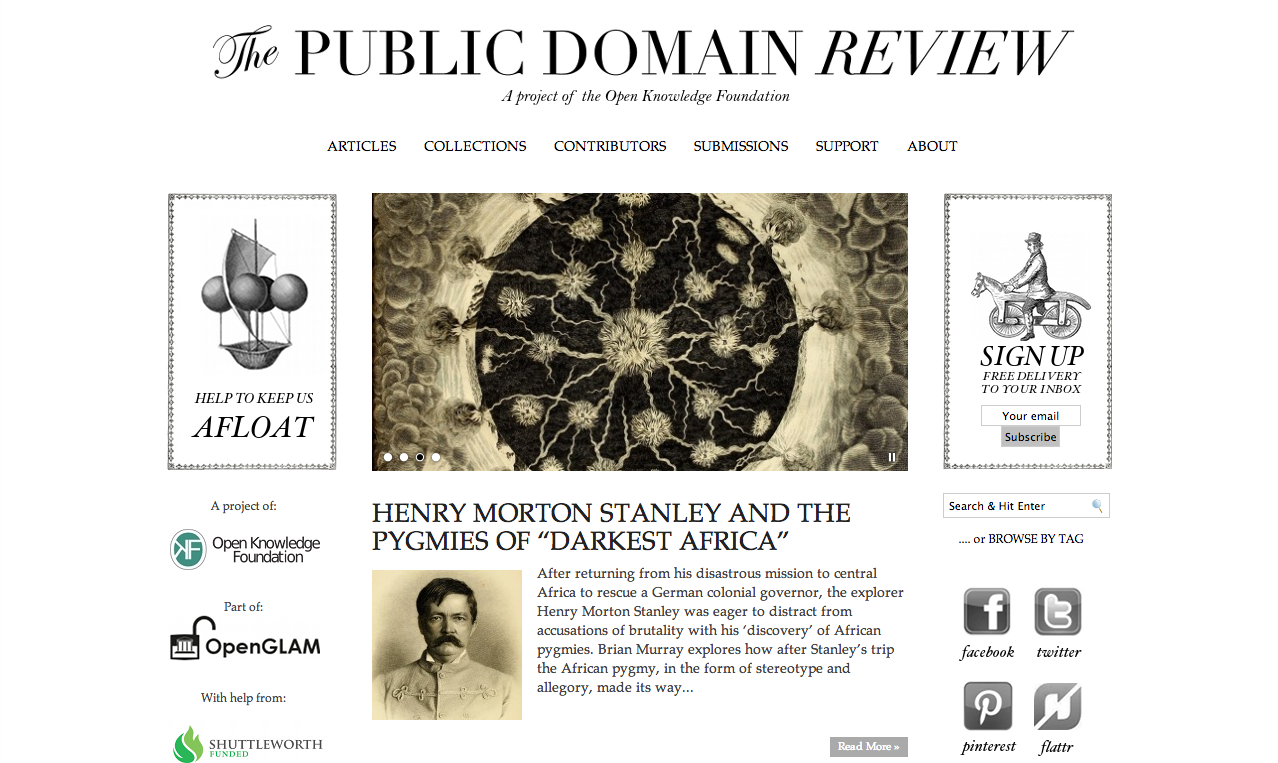
- Available in: English
- Headquarters: Manchester
- Owner: The Public Domain Review CIC
- Editor: Adam Green
- Website: publicdomainreview.org
- Commercial: No
- Registration: None required
- Launched: January 1, 2011; 15 years ago
- Current status: Online
- Content license: Creative Commons Attribution/ Share-Alike 3.0 (unquoted text in collection posts and articles only)

The Public Domain Review is an online journal showcasing works which have entered the public domain. It was co-founded by Jonathan Gray and Adam Green. It was launched on January 1, 2011, to coincide with Public Domain Day.

The Review aims to raise awareness of the public domain by promoting public domain works from across the web, including from Europeana, the Internet Archive, and Wikimedia Commons. As well as curated collections of public domain images, texts, and films, it features longer essays from contemporary writers, scholars, and public intellectuals. The Guardian reviewed it as "magnificent ... a model of digital curation", an interview in Vice labelled it "beautifully curated", and The A.V. Club described it as "endlessly and deeply absorbing".

It regularly contributes collections to The New Inquiry, and collections are frequently highlighted by diverse publications including The Huffington Post, The Paris Review, and The New York Times.

Contributors of articles have included Julian Barnes, Frank Delaney Jack Zipes, Richard Hamblyn, Philipp Blom, and Arika Okrent. In addition to the thematic essays, a monthly "Curator's Choice" series highlights professional curators' essays about material from their cultural institutions.

The Review published its first print anthology in late 2014, a collection of 34 essays published online during 2011–13. It was reviewed as "an incredible collection of esoterica" by The Paris Review, and featured as one of Wired's best science books of 2014. A second volume in The Public Domain: Selected Essays print series was published in 2015.

It was originally launched with seed funding from the Open Knowledge Foundation and the Shuttleworth Foundation before becoming an independent Community interest company supported by its readers.

== Bibliography ==
- Adam, Green, ed. (2014). "The Public Domain Review: Selected Essays: The First Three Years, 2011-2013". The Public Domain Review: Selected Essays. Cambridge, UK: PDR Press. ISSN 2056-953X. OCLC 903052212. Archived from the original on March 4, 2016.
- Adam, Green, ed. (2015). "The Public Domain Review: Selected Essays, Vol. II". The Public Domain Review: Selected Essays. Cambridge, UK: PDR Press. ISSN 2056-953X. Archived from the original on February 7, 2016.
