= Inventors' Day =

Day dedicated to contributions of inventors

Inventors' Day is a day of the year set aside by a country to recognise the contributions of inventors. Not all countries recognise Inventors' Day. Those countries which do recognise an Inventors' Day do so with varying degrees of emphasis and on different days of the year.

== By location ==
=== Argentina ===
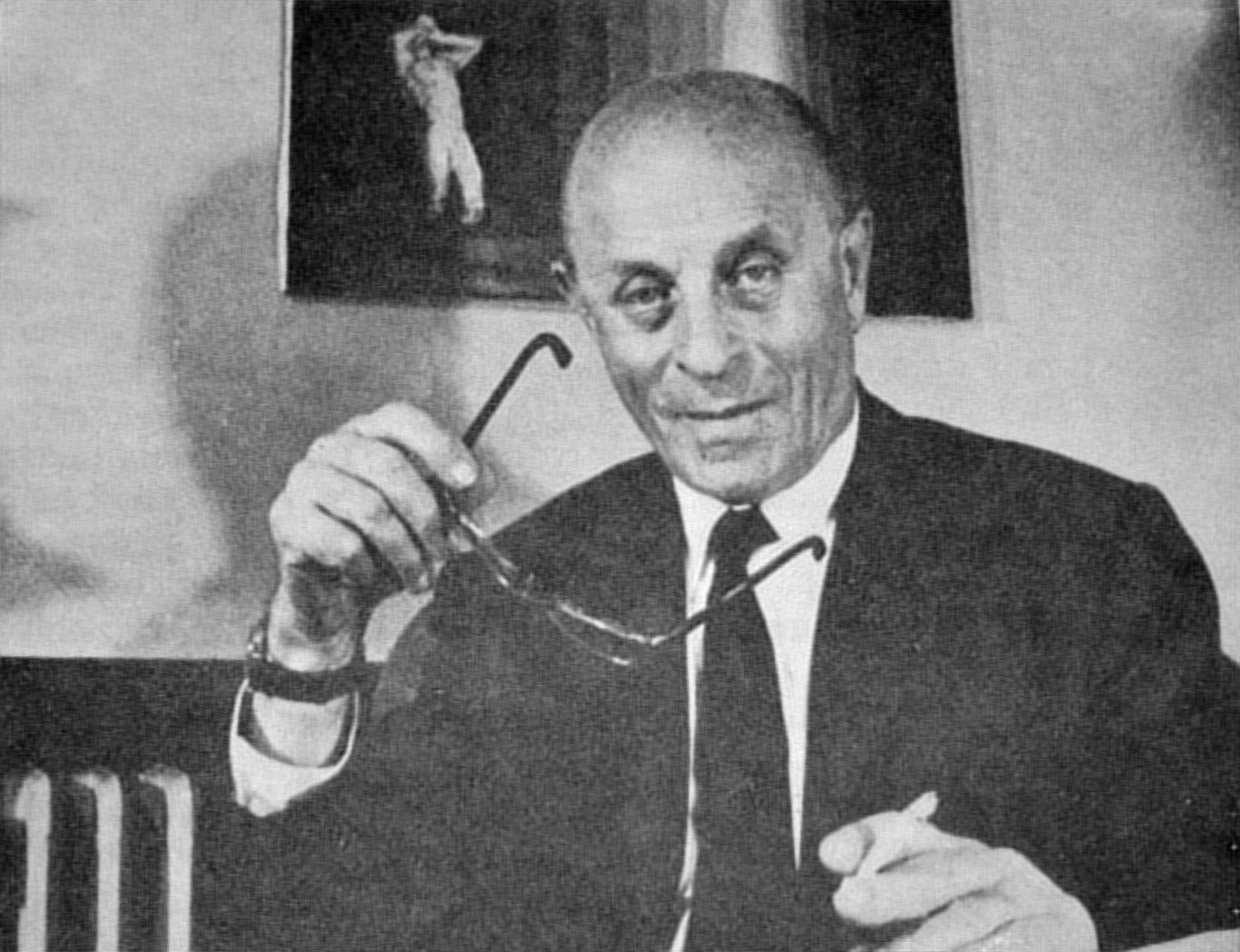
László József Bíró

The Inventors' Day (Spanish: Día del Inventor) in Argentina has been celebrated since 1986 and is held yearly on 29 September, the birthday of the inventor of the ballpoint pen, László József Bíró.

=== Austria, Germany and Switzerland ===
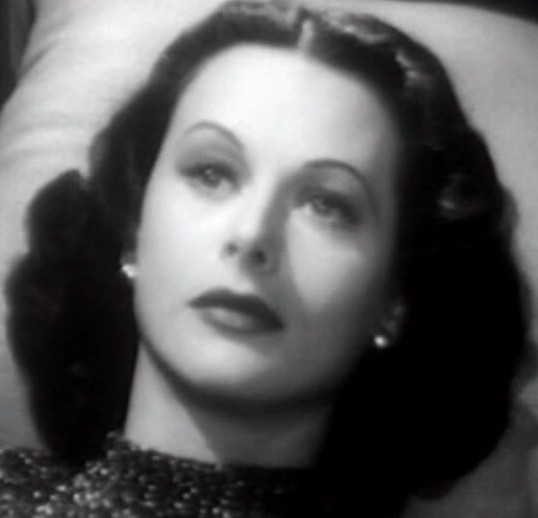
Hedy Lamarr, actress and inventor

The Inventors' Day (German: Tag der Erfinder) in the German-speaking countries Germany, Austria and Switzerland is celebrated on 9 November, the birthday of the Austrian-born inventor and Hollywood actress Hedy Lamarr whose main invention was the frequency-hopped spread spectrum 1942.

The day was proclaimed by Berlin inventors and entrepreneurs Gerhard Muthenthaler and Marijan Jordan. According to the website of the organisation it intends to pursue the following goals:

- Encourage people towards their own ideas and for a change to the better
- Remind people of forgotten inventors

=== Brazil ===
The Inventors' Day (Portuguese: Dia do Inventor) in Brazil is celebrated on 4 November.

=== Hungary ===
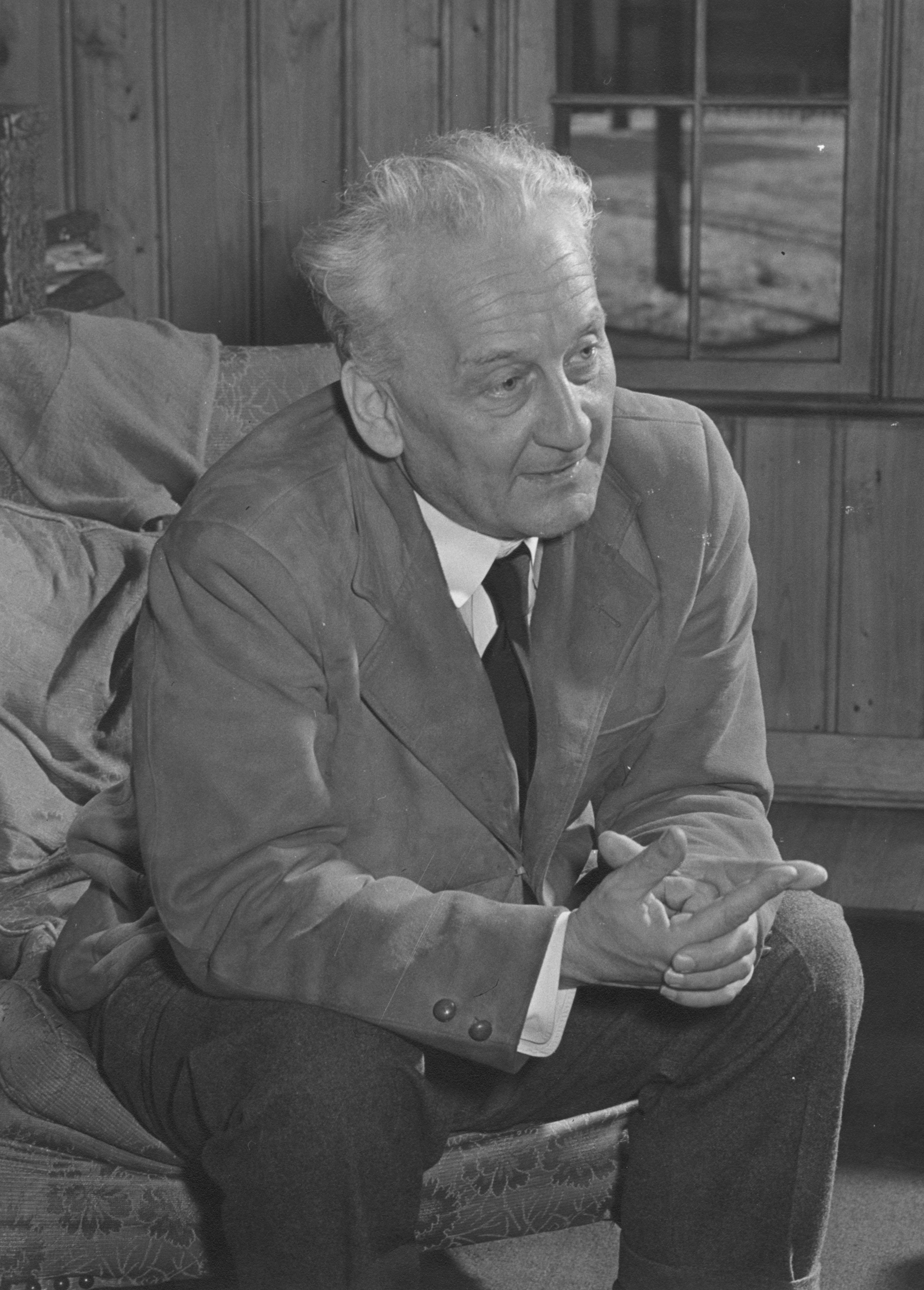
Albert Szent-Györgyi, who won the Nobel Prize in Physiology or Medicine in 1937

Hungarian Inventors' Day (Magyar Feltalálók Napja) is celebrated on 13 June in memoriam of Albert Szent-Györgyi who registered his national patent about the synthesized Vitamin C in 1941. It is celebrated by the Association of Hungarian Inventors (MAFE) since 2009.

=== Moldova ===
Since 1995, the Republic of Moldova has celebrated an Inventors' and Rationalizers' Day annually at the end of June.

=== Russia ===
Since 1957, Russia has celebrated an Inventors' and Rationalizers' Day (Russian: День изобретателя и рационализатора) annually at the last Saturday of June.

=== Thailand ===
Thailand recognises 2 February as Inventors' Day each year. The Thai Cabinet set this date to commemorate the anniversary of His Majesty King Bhumibol Adulyadej’s allocation of a patent for a slow speed surface aerator on 2 February 1993.

=== United Kingdom ===
While as of yet, the United Kingdom does not officially recognize an Inventor's Day, in 2014 BT made a public appeal to celebrate "the first" National Inventor's Day on 2 December 2014. While many countries celebrate inventiveness on a significant day relating to one of that country's inventors, 2 December does not appear to have such a relationship. However, the day was also the release of a study by BT of the inventiveness of UK residents. As of 9 November 2016 there has not been any announcement of a second or subsequent National Inventor's Day in the United Kingdom.

=== United States ===
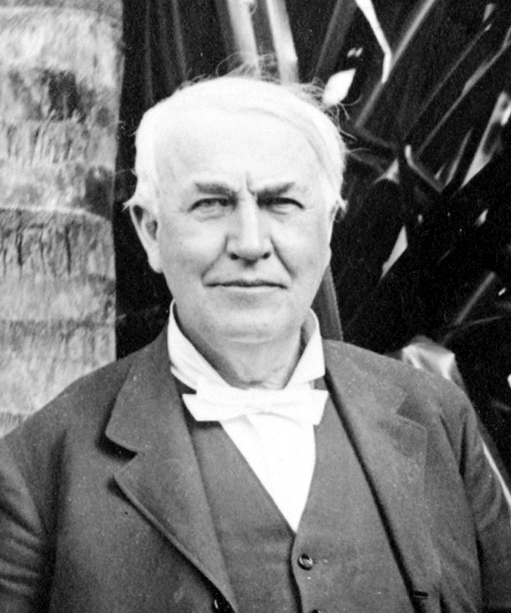
Thomas Alva Edison

Ronald Reagan as President of the United States proclaimed 11 February 1983 as National Inventors' Day, Proclamation 5013, to "...call upon the people of the United States to observe this day with appropriate ceremonies and activities".

In recognition of the enormous contribution inventors make to the nation and the world, the Congress, pursuant to Senate Joint Resolution 140 (Public Law 97 – 198), has designated 11 February, the anniversary of the birth of the inventor Thomas Alva Edison, who held over 1,000 patents, as National Inventors' Day.

== See also ==
- The heroic theory of invention and scientific development
- World Intellectual Property Day
- World Book and Copyright Day
