= Public Domain Day =

Observance for when works enter the public domain

- Logo for the 2026/27 Public Domain Day
- Official name: International Public Domain Day
- Also called: PDD
- Significance: Celebrates the freedom to use the new entities that are entering public domain in the new year as much as they want without infringing copyright
- Date: January 1
- Next time: January 1, 2027
- Frequency: Annual

Public Domain Day (PDD) is an observance of when copyrights expire and works enter into the public domain. This legal transition of copyright works into the public domain usually happens every year on January 1 based on the individual copyright laws of each country.

The observance of a "Public Domain Day" was initially informal; the earliest known mention was in 2004 by Wallace McLean (a Canadian public domain activist), with support for the idea echoed by Lawrence Lessig. Several websites list the authors whose works are entering the public domain each January 1. There are activities in countries around the world by various organizations all under the banner Public Domain Day.

== Public domain ==
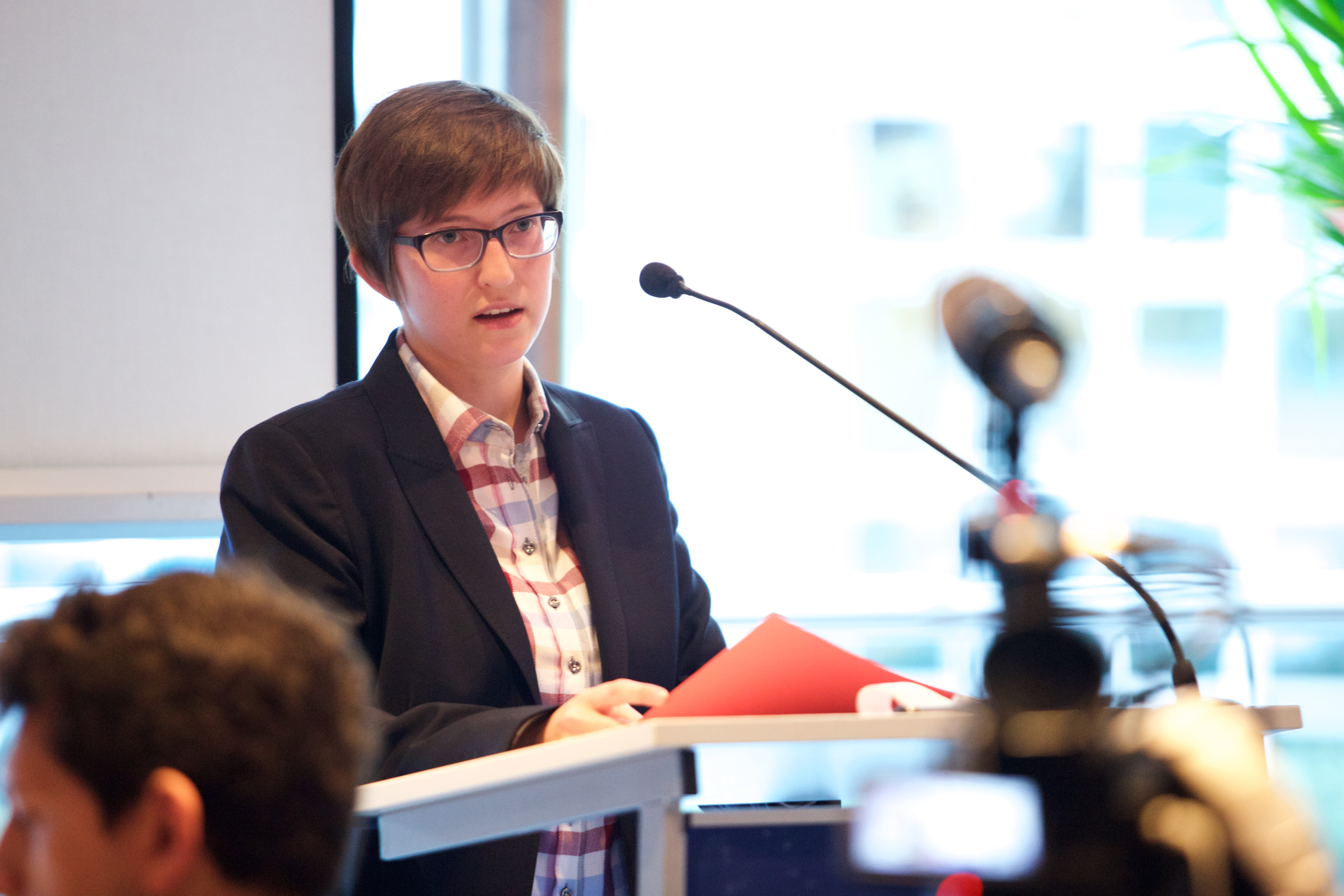
A public domain photo from a public domain celebration in 2016 (Brussels, Felix Reda speaking)

Copyright protection terms are typically described as expiring a number of years after the end of the calendar year when the author died (post mortem auctoris or pma). Durations vary by country; in many jurisdictions, including the US and European Union, copyright usually lasts 70 years pma. In such countries, the works of authors who died in 1956 will pass into the public domain on January 1, 2027. These works become fully available so that anyone can access and use them for any purpose, without authorization.

Since public domain rights vary based on jurisdiction, the passage of a work into the public domain is not worldwide. In the United States, no additional published works entered the public domain automatically from 1999 to 2018. Each year, most European countries see various works passing into the public domain, as do Canada, Australia, and New Zealand.

Public Domain Day in 2010 celebrated the entry to the public domain in many countries of the works of authors such as Sigmund Freud, William Butler Yeats, Ford Madox Ford and Arthur Rackham. In 2011, it celebrated the public domain status of Isaac Babel, Walter Benjamin, John Buchan, Mikhail Bulgakov, F. Scott Fitzgerald, Emma Goldman, Paul Klee, Selma Lagerlöf, Leon Trotsky, Vito Volterra, Nathanael West, and others.

Significant materials entering the public domain in 2021 included F. Scott Fitzgerald's The Great Gatsby, Virginia Woolf's Mrs. Dalloway, Ernest Hemingway's In Our Time, Franz Kafka's The Trial, and the jazz standard "Sweet Georgia Brown".

In 2025, copyrighted works from 1929 entered the public domain in the United States.

== Celebrations and milestones ==
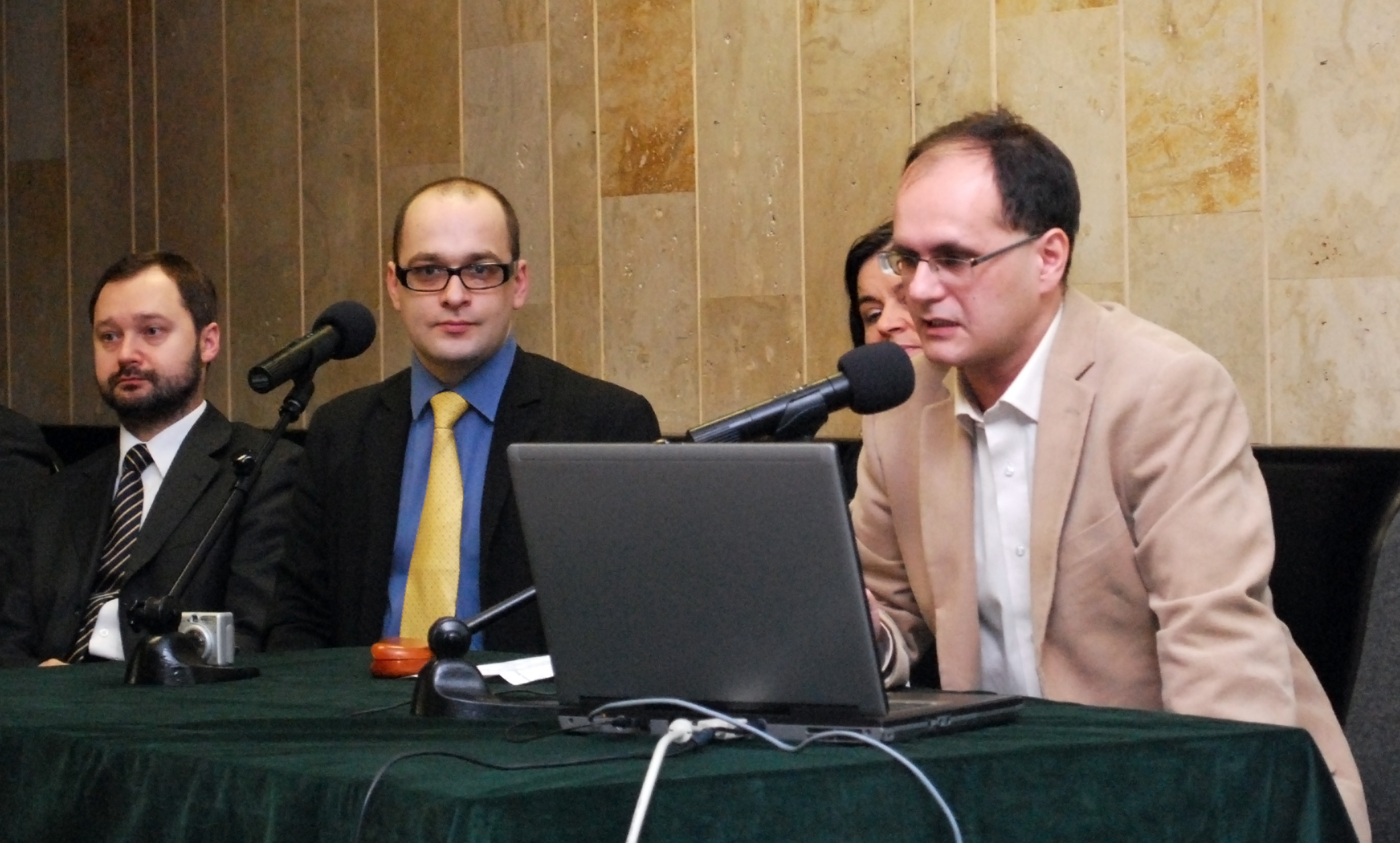
Public Domain Day celebration in Poland (2008)

Public Domain Day 2020 celebration in Indonesia

There is no explicit time when Public Domain Day began being observed (it was mentioned by Lawrence Lessig in 2004), but in recent years it has been mentioned by Project Gutenberg and has been promoted by Creative Commons. Public Domain Day events have been hosted on various dates in Poland, Germany, Switzerland, Italy and Israel.

In January 2011, to celebrate Public Domain Day 2011, Open Knowledge Foundation launched The Public Domain Review, a web-based review of works which have entered the public domain.

In January 2012, a celebration was announced in Warsaw, Poland, and for the first time in Kraków, where for several years on that day various activities have been organized by free culture NGOs (such as Koalicja Otwartej Edukacji and Open Society Institute) and other supporters. Other 2012 events announced worldwide:

- Switzerland: Public Domain Jam, Zurich
- Israel: PD Day Celebration at Haifa University, Haifa
- North Macedonia: Events and promotional activities on the Public Domain
- Italy:
  - La giornata del Pubblico Dominio, Turin
  - Festeggiamo il Giorno del Pubblico Dominio, Rome
  - Celebriamo il Giorno del Pubblico Dominio e la Cultura Libera, Grosseto
- France: Journée du domaine public, Paris

In later years, Public Domain Day events have been organized by Communia, which also maintained the publicdomainday.org website.

=== 2019 ===
Public Domain Day in 2019 was significant in the United States as it was the first year to have any meaningful copyright expirations there since the event's establishment: a 20-year freeze had been imposed in 1998 with the passage of the Sonny Bono Copyright Term Extension Act. Several activities were carried to celebrate the event, including a special section at the MIT Libraries for public domain works and the "Grand Re-Opening of the Public Domain" that took place at the Internet Archive with the presence of members of Creative Commons, the Electronic Frontier Foundation and the Wikimedia Foundation, among other scholars like Pam Samuelson, Lawrence Lessig and James Boyle.

=== 2022 ===
In 2022 in the United States, in addition to works published in 1926 that had had their copyright renewed, about 400,000 sound recordings from before 1923 also passed into the public domain under the CLASSICS Act. The earliest iteration of Winnie-the-Pooh became public domain.

=== 2024 ===
On 2024's Public Domain Day, all published works from 1928 entered the public domain. This included the animated short film Steamboat Willie, featuring Mickey Mouse, a subject of significant copyright interest. The inclusion of this work was a landmark event, ending years of controversies, although Disney might still claim trademark rights on Mickey Mouse, with only Mickey's earliest appearances being public domain. Additionally, all sound recordings from 1923 entered into the public domain. No sound recordings had entered the public domain in 2023, as all pre-1923 recordings already entered into the public domain in 2022. However, recordings from 1923 to 1946 enter the public domain on January 1 of the year after their 100th year after publication. Thus, a recording published in June 1923, for example, would have entered the public domain on January 1, 2024. The earliest versions of Peter Pan became public domain in 2024. The relevant plays were published in 1928, despite the character having debuted in 1902.

=== 2025 ===
The earliest versions of Popeye the Sailor Man and Tintin became public domain figures. It was the first day that all songs, art, films and books from the 1920s were public domain in the United States, with the only exception being sound recordings.

=== 2026 ===
The earliest versions of Betty Boop entered the public domain, as did the first four Nancy Drew novels. It is also the first time since 1977 that a new decade of works, the 1930s, began to uniformly enter the public domain in the United States.

== See also ==
- 2023 in public domain
- Culture Freedom Day
- Document Freedom Day
- Hardware Freedom Day
- List of public domain projects
- Public domain in the United States
- Software Freedom Day
