= Gerd Klier =

German footballer

Personal information
- Full name: Gerd Klier
- Date of birth: 16 January 1944
- Place of birth: Oestrich, German Reich
- Date of death: 21 March 2011 (aged 67)
- Place of death: Germany
- Height: 1.69 m (5 ft 7 in)
- Position: Striker

Youth career
- 1950–1963: FC Oestrich 1920

Senior career*
Years	Team	Apps	(Gls)
1963–1965	FV Biebrich 02		
1965–1967	Freiburger FC		(25)
1967–1968	Fortuna Düsseldorf	15	(7)
1968–1970	FC 08 Villingen		(45)
1970–1971	Hamburger SV	24	(4)
1971–1977	1. FSV Mainz 05	179	(114)
1977–1978	FVgg Kastel 06		
- * Club domestic league appearances and goals

Gerd Klier (16 January 1944 – 21 March 2011) was a professional German footballer.

Klier made a total of 24 appearances in the Fußball-Bundesliga for Hamburger SV during his playing career.
