= Hardware Freedom Day =

Hardware Freedom Day logo

Hardware Freedom Day is an annual celebration organized by the Digital Freedom Foundation. The goal of Hardware Freedom Day is to celebrate the spirit of open hardware and make more people aware of using and contributing to free and hardware projects. The first Hardware Freedom Day was held on April 20, 2013. The 2024 date is 4/20.

== Goals ==
- To spread awareness about free and open hardware
- To encourage user contribution
- To provide a common platform for people passionate about open hardware to share their ideas and interests

== Schedule ==
Anybody can organize a Hardware Freedom Day event and there is no rigid schedule followed. Digital Freedom Foundation co-ordinates the event at a global level, providing support, giveaways and a centralized collaboration space. However, volunteer teams around the world organize the events by themselves.

Some common activities of Hardware Freedom Day events are

- Workshops on various kinds of open hardware
- Open hacking competitions
- Demonstrations of projects
- Introduction of new projects
- Talks

== Open hardware ==
In the context of Hardware Freedom Day, the term open hardware encompasses physical devices whose design can be shared in public without restriction and freely modified and re-distributed.

The design includes all information that a person would need to re-create the device.

== 2015-2016 issues ==
The Digital Freedom Foundation servers were hacked over Christmas 2015 (posted on their mailing list) and have struggled to come back up. HFD 2016 is planned for April 9, 2016 but no registration is available which will make this year celebration hard to follow.

== See also ==
- Document Freedom Day
- Software Freedom Day
- Culture Freedom Day
- Public Domain Day
- International Day Against DRM
- List of open-source hardware projects
