= Culture Freedom Day =

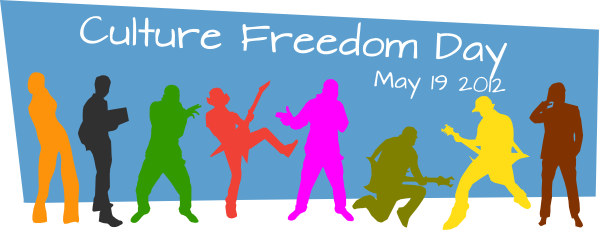
Logo of the Culture Freedom Day

Culture Freedom Day is an observance of free culture. It takes place annually on the third Saturday of May. It aims at educating the worldwide public about the benefits of using and encouraging free culture as well as providing an international day to serve as a platform to promote free culture artists.

== Free culture ==
The term "free culture" was originally the title of a 2004 book by Lawrence Lessig, considered a founding father of the free culture movement. Free culture movement is dedicated to creating and making available their art, allowing others to freely use, study, distribute and improve on the work of others. Redistribution of those improvements are of course allowed and encouraged. The free culture movement opposes practices such as copyright extensions and attempts at suppressing the 'fair use rights' by the traditional media industry.

== Celebrations ==
The first observance of the Culture Freedom Day dates to 2012. It takes place on the third Saturday of each May.

The Culture Freedom Day has been inspired by the Software Freedom Day, an observance of free and open source software that has increasingly included elements of celebrating free culture going beyond just software related issues. It aims at educating the worldwide public about the benefits of using and encouraging free culture as well as providing an international day to serve as a platform to promote free culture artists.

The first 2012 celebrations took place a week ahead of schedule, on 11–12 May in Lisbon, Portugal. As of May 16, 2012, celebrations were planned in 16 countries worldwide.

Culture Freedom Day is organized by Digital Freedom Foundation, a nonprofit organization that also promotes software freedom. The event is supported by the Creative Commons organization.

== See also ==
- Document Freedom Day
- Software Freedom Day
- Hardware Freedom Day
- International Day Against DRM
- Public Domain Day
