= Software Freedom Day =

Celebration of free software

Logo

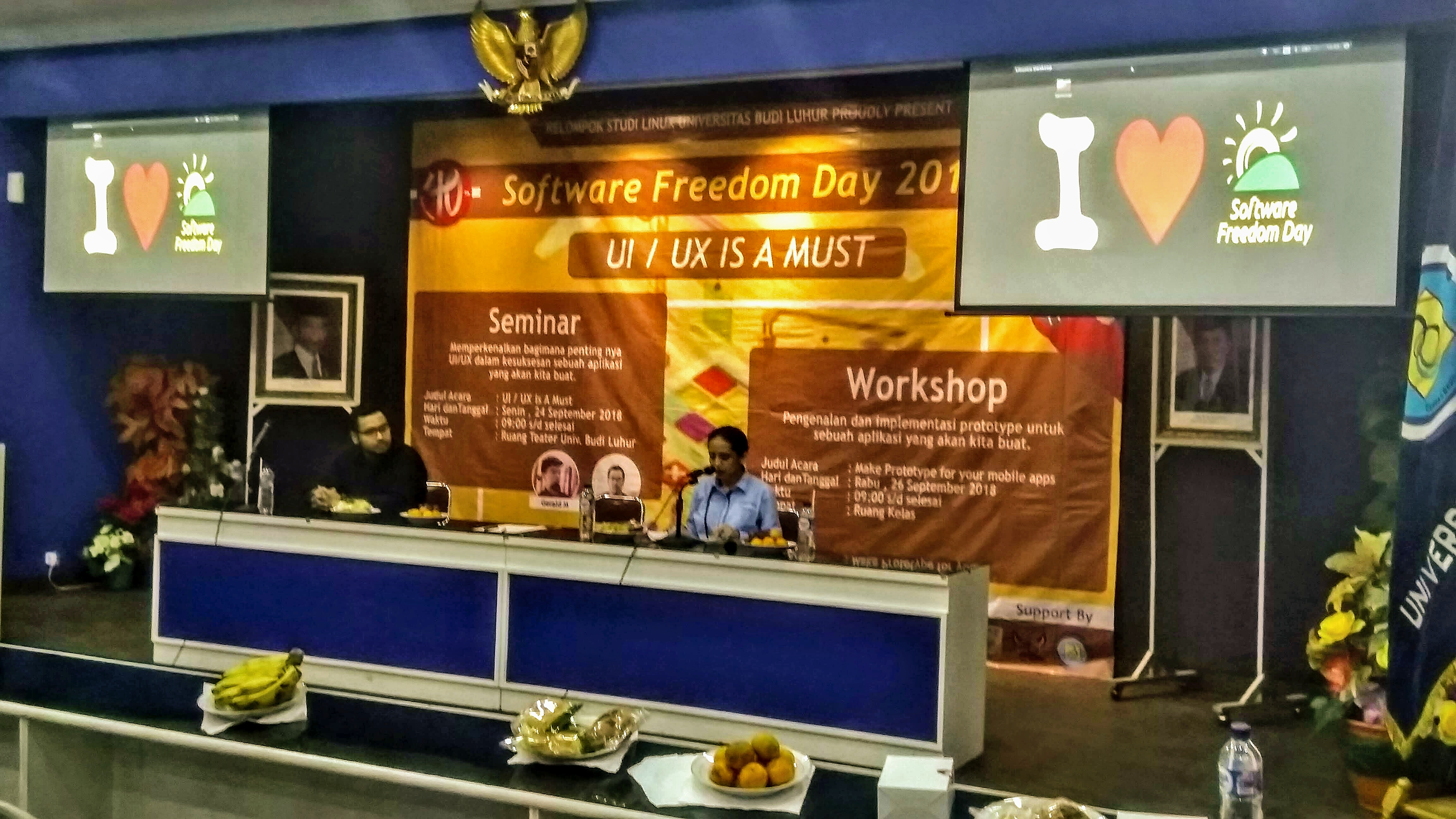
Software Freedom Day 2018 seminar at Budi Luhur University, Jakarta, Indonesia

Software Freedom Day (SFD) is an annual worldwide celebration of Free Software organized by the Digital Freedom Foundation (DFF). SFD is a public education effort with the aim of increasing awareness of Free Software and its virtues, and encouraging its use.

SFD was established in 2004 and was first observed on 28 August of that year. About 12 teams participated in the first Software Freedom Day. Since that time it has grown in popularity and while organisers anticipated more than 1,000 teams in 2010 the event has stalled at around 400+ locations over the past two years, representing a 30% decrease over 2009.

Since 2006, Software Freedom Day has been held on the third Saturday of September. In 2026, this event will be held on the 19th of September.

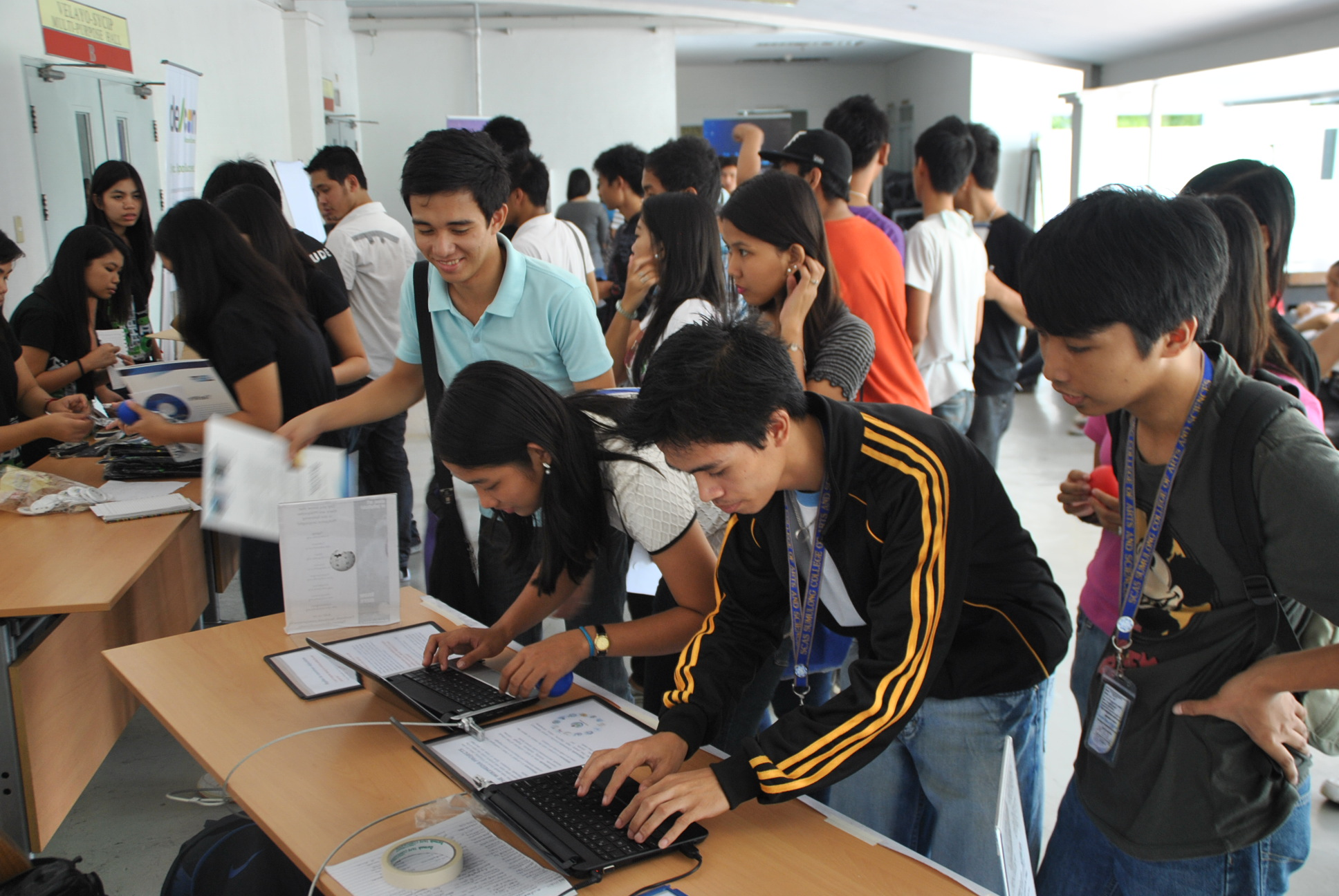
Students lined up to register at the Software Freedom Day 2011 event in the University of Santo Tomas, Manila, Philippines

== Organization ==
Each event is left to local teams around the world to organize. Pre-registered teams (2 months before the date or earlier) receive free schwag sent by DFF to help with the events themselves. The SFD wiki contains individual team pages describing their plans as well as helpful information to get them up to speed. Events themselves vary between conferences explaining the virtues of Free and Open Source Software, to workshops, demonstrations, games, planting tree ceremonies, discussions and InstallFests.

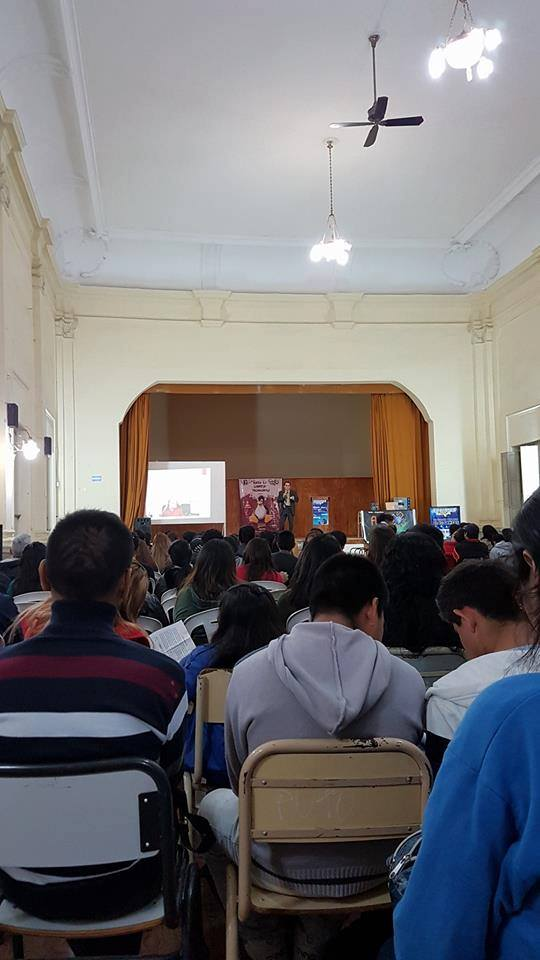
Professor Rodrigo Gastón Manresa conference at the Software Freedom Day 2016 event in the Superior Institute of General Manuel Belgrano 6001, Salta, Argentina

=== Past events ===
| Time | Teams | Countries | Source |
|---|---|---|---|
| 28 August 2004 | 12 | N/A | linux.com |
| 10 September 2005 | 136 | 60 | linux.com SFD 2005 map |
| 16 September 2006 | 180 | 70 | SFD 2006 map |
| 15 September 2007 | 286 | 80 | SFD 2007 map |
| 20 September 2008 | 563 | 90 | SFD 2008 map |
| 19 September 2009 | 700 | 90 | SFD 2009 map |
| 18 September 2010 | 397 | 90 | SFD 2010 map |
| 17 September 2011 | 442 | 87 | SFD 2011 map |
| 15 September 2012 | 301 | 73 | SFD 2012 map |
| 21 September 2013 | 316 | 81 | SFD 2013 map |
| 20 September 2014 | 197 | 59 | SFD 2014 map |
| 19 September 2015 | 141 | 47 | SFD 2015 map |
| 17 September 2016 | 128 | 51 | SFD 2016 map |
| 16 September 2017 | 88 | 44 | SFD 2017 map |
| 15 September 2018 | 71 | 37 | SFD 2018 map |
| 21 September 2019 | 59 | 36 | SFD 2019 map |
| 19 September 2020 | 18 | 18 | SFD 2020 wiki |
| 18 September 2021 | 60 | 28 | SFD 2021 wiki |
| 17 September 2022 | 43 | 20 | SFD 2022 wiki |
| 16 September 2023 | 49 | 30 | SFD 2023 wiki Archived 1 October 2023 at the Wayback Machine |
| 21 September 2024 | 66 | 28 | Digital Freedom Foundation Blog event overview |

Note on the figures above: it is difficult to find figures of the early years. The maps on the SFD website are only reliable after 2007, however some years such as 2009 saw extra teams from two different sources which did not "officially" register with DFF. There was about 80 teams from China and a hundred from the Sun community (OSUM) who heavily subsidized goodies for their teams. In the early year of SFD the map was an optional component not connected with the registration script and therefore some teams did not go through the troubles of adding themselves.

== Sponsors ==
In the past, the event has been sponsored by entities like Canonical Ltd., IBM, Sun Microsystems, DKUUG, Google, Red Hat, Linode, Nokia and MakerBot Industries.

- Sponsorship in 2023: Musescore, Digital Peak
- Sponsorship in 2024: Huion
- Sponsorship in 2025: LPI, Jensen Technology

This event also has the long term support of Earth Cause, Linode, Mailman, FSF, FSFE, Joomla, Creative Commons, Admin Magazine, Linux Journal, Ubuntu User and Woman Tech.

Each local team can seek sponsors independently, especially local FOSS supporting organizations, and often appears in local medias such as newspapers and TV.

== See also ==
- Outline of free software
- Document Freedom Day
- Hardware Freedom Day
- Culture Freedom Day
- Public Domain Day
- List of public domain projects
- International Day Against DRM, promoted by the Free Software Foundation in its Defective by Design campaign
