= Document Freedom Day =

The Document Freedom Day dove

Document Freedom Day (DFD) is an annual event to "celebrate and raise awareness of Open Standards". It is celebrated on the last Wednesday of March each year. Document Freedom Day was first celebrated on 26 March 2008, and has continued to be celebrated every year since.

Document Freedom Day is organised by a team of volunteers of the Digital Freedom Foundation since 2016. It was previously organised by the Free Software Foundation Europe. DFD is funded by donors and partners which vary from year to year.

DFD 2013 was the largest ever with 60 events in 30 countries. A year later, in 2014, 51 groups in 22 countries held events celebrating Document Freedom Day. In 2019 it took place on Wednesday 27 March.

== Relationship to free software ==
Document Freedom Day is a campaign about open standards and document formats, aimed at a non-technical audience. Open standards ensure communication is independent of software vendor; this, in turn, ensures that people "are able to communicate and work using Free Software."

Document freedom addresses much more than just essays and spreadsheets, it is about control of any kind of a digital data - including artwork, sheet and recorded music, email, and statistics. These can be stored in ways which empower users, but they can also be stored in formats which constrain and manipulate users at enormous cost. Documents that are not free are locked to some particular software or company. The author cannot choose how to use them because they are controlled by technical restrictions.

== Relationship to open standards ==
According to Document Freedom volunteers, "Open Standards are essential for interoperability and freedom of choice based on the merits of different software applications. They provide freedom from data lock-in and the subsequent supplier lock-in. This makes Open Standards essential for governments, companies, organisations and individual users of information technology."

== Past dates ==
- 26 March 2008
- 25 March 2009
- 31 March 2010
- 30 March 2011
- 28 March 2012
- 27 March 2013
- 26 March 2014
- 25 March 2015
- 30 March 2016
- 29 March 2017
- 28 March 2018
- 27 March 2019
- 25 March 2020
- 31 March 2021
- 30 March 2022
- 26 March 2023
- 27 March 2024
- 26 March 2025

== See also ==
- Digital dark age
- OpenDocument
- Portable Document Format
- LibreOffice
- Apache OpenOffice
- Calligra Suite
- KOffice
- Software Freedom Day
- Hardware Freedom Day
- Culture Freedom Day
