= Notorious Markets List =

This is the list of notorious markets compiled by the Office of the United States Trade Representative, which claims that they are markets where large-scale intellectual property infringement takes place. The official list is divided in online and physical markets (see column "Type").

== Current markets ==
This is a list of notorious markets listed in the 2025 report (published in 2026).

Name	Type	Location	Notes	Listed since	References
1337x	Online	Finland	Provides links to torrent files	2017	
1Fichier	Online	France	Cyberlocker, popular in France	2017	
Avito.ru	Online	Russia	Classified advertising site with high volume of counterfeit goods	2022	
Baidu Wangpan	Online	China	Widely share links to pirated movies, TV shows, and books	2020	
Cuevana	Online	Argentina	File sharing website streaming unlicensed television and movie titles	2021	
DDoS-Guard	Online	Russia	Web hosting website hosting several phishing and cybercrime websites	2025	
DHgate	Online	China	Business-to-business e-commerce site in China Widespread availability of counterfeit items	2017	
Douyin Shangcheng (Douyin Mall)	Online	China	Shopping platform under Douyin that provides access to counterfeit items	2025	
Fire Video Player	Online	Turkey (reported)	"Piracy-as-a-service" website that hosts video piracy streaming sites	2025	
FitGirl Repacks	Online	Unknown	Provides access to compressed versions of unauthorized and pirated versions of video games	2025	
FlokiNET	Online	Romania, Iceland	Bulletproof hosting provider, hosts 1337x	2018	
GeniPTV	Online	Unknown	IPTV provider that provides access to broadcast and streaming channels	2025	
HiAnime	Online	Unknown	Successor to Aniwatch that distributes pirated versions of anime movies and television		
IndiaMART	Online	India	Sells counterfeit and illegal pharmaceuticals, not listed individually in 2019 report (hosted by Hosting Concepts B.V. and Regional Network Information Center JSC) Not listed in 2020, but relisted in 2021	2017	
KrakenFiles	Online	Unknown	Cyberlocker that distributes pre-release music and pirated music tracks and albums	2025	
Library Genesis (LibGen)	Online	Unknown	Provides unauthorized access to books, sources papers and journals from Sci-Hub Not listed in 2020, but relisted in 2021	2016	
MagisTV	Online	Latin America (reported)	Provides access to unauthorized live sports streams and television channels, shows, and movies for a monthly subscription	2025	
MegaCloud	Online	Vietnam (reported)	Formerly operated under 2embed, which was taken down in 2023; scrapes copyright-infringing television series and movies and provides access to pirate streaming sites	2025	
Mig Flash	Online	Unknown	Sells third-party accessories for the Nintendo Switch and Nintendo Switch 2 that can produce data dumps of games and redistribute them to other users	2025	
MyFlixerz	Online	Vietnam (reported)	Provides access to pirated streams and direct access to pirated movies and television shows		
Pinduoduo	Online	China	E-commerce site selling counterfeit goods	2018	
Private Layer	Online	Panama (reported), Switzerland	Supports infringing sites by refusing take-down requests from copyrightholders	2025	
RapidGator	Online	Russia	Large cyberlocker	2016	
RuTracker	Online	Russia	Popular torrent site	2016	
SaveFrom	Online	Unknown	Stream-ripping site that enables downloading of copyright-protected videos	2025	
Sci-Hub	Online	Russia (reported)	Provides unauthorized access to academic papers and journals, related to Library Genesis	2017	
Squitter	Online	Unknown	Hosts online piracy services and ignores take-down request from copyright holders	2025	
Streamtape	Online	Unknown	Video hosting service that offers unlimited storage and bandwidth, often used for sharing pirated videos	2025	
Taobao	Online	China	E-commerce site selling counterfeit goods, operated by Alibaba	2016	
The Pirate Bay	Online	Unknown	One of the first torrent sites, very vocal in openly promoting piracy	2016	
UnknownCheats	Online	Unknown	Allows users to share and develop video game cheat codes, which may copy source code material from copyrighted games	2025	
Vegamovies	Online	Unknown	Provides access to pirated international television shows and movies, especially copyrighted media originating from India	2025	
Virtual Systems, LLC	Online	Ukraine (reported)	Bulletproof hosting site that services websites distributing pirated material, as well as IPTV services	2025	
VK	Online	Russia	Social media site that facilitates video piracy	2016	
WHMCS Smarters	Online	Mohali, Punjab, India	Company that allows customers to set up illegal Internet Protocol television businesses	2025	
Y2Mate	Online	Unknown	YouTube stream ripping site	2025	
YTS.MX	Online	Bulgaria (reported)	Peer-to-peer file sharing site	2022	
Barrio Once	Physical	Buenos Aires, Argentina	Has many indoor and outdoor street vendors of counterfeit products, including clothing and accessories	2025	
La Salada	Physical	Buenos Aires, Argentina	One of the largest black markets for illegal goods in Argentina	2016	
Rua 25 de Março	Physical	São Paulo, Brazil	Notorious for shopping malls that sell pirated and counterfeit goods	2016	
Central Market	Physical	Phnom Penh, Cambodia	Historic landmark in Cambodia, stores throughout the area sell counterfeit goods	2018	
Pacific Mall	Physical	Markham, Ontario	Market with large amount of counterfeit luxury goods, apparel, and electronics Not listed in 2018, 2019, or 2020, but relisted in 2021	2017	
Baiyun Leather Trading Center	Physical	Guangzhou, Guangdong, China	Center that sells counterfeit clothing accessories at storefronts and in secret showrooms, and may also ship counterfeit items internationally	2025	
Huaqiangbei Electronics Malls	Physical	Shenzhen, Guangdong, China	A central distribution hub for counterfeit electronic devices and components; also includes Yuan Wang Digital Mall, Long Sheng Communications Market, Tongtiandi Communication Market Feixyang Yang Times, SEG Communications Market and Taixing Communications Market. Huaqiangbei Digital World and Man Har Digital Plaza Malls	2018	
Kinsun Market near Zhanxi Road	Physical	Guangzhou, China	Market that almost exclusively sells counterfeit clothing and clothing accessories	2025	
Luohu Commercial City	Physical	Shenzhen, Guangdong, China	Half of the mall's merchandise consists of counterfeit goods	2018	
Wu’ai Market	Physical	Shenyang, Liaoning, China	Largest market in northeastern China, hub for counterfeit products	2016	
San Andresitos Market	Physical	Bogotá, Colombia	Collection of over 600 shopping centers selling counterfeit phones, clothing, and clothing accessories	2025	
Musafir Khana Market	Physical	Mumbai, India	Popular market selling cosmetics, electronics, watches, and accessories	2025	
Sadar Patrappa Road Market	Physical	Bengaluru, India	Sells counterfeit electronic products and pirated software	2025	
Tank Road	Physical	Delhi, India	Sells counterfeit apparel and footwear	2017	
Mangga Dua Market	Physical	Jakarta, Indonesia	Sells various counterfeit goods	2016	
Dordoy/Dordoi Market	Physical	Bishkek, Kyrgyz Republic	Sells various counterfeit goods Not listed in 2020, but relisted in 2021	2019	
Petaling Street Market	Physical	Kuala Lumpur, Malaysia	Sells various counterfeit goods	2018	
El Santuario	Physical	Guadalajara, Mexico	Sells and distributes illicit drugs and counterfeit, stolen, and expired medication	2025	
Mercado San Juan de Dios	Physical	Guadalajara, Mexico	Largest indoor market in Latin America; one third of vendors sell devices to circumvent digital rights management	2016	
Tepito	Physical	Mexico City, Mexico	Sells and distributed counterfeit goods; region is dangerous, making it nearly impossible for right holders to enforce their rights	2016	
Ciudad del Este	Physical	Paraguay	Regional hub for the manufacturing and distribution of counterfeit products	2016	
Gamarra District	Physical	La Victoria, Lima, Peru	Sells counterfeit textiles, has e-commerce site	2020	
Polvos Azules	Physical	La Victoria, Lima, Peru	Sells counterfeit textiles, fashion accessories, and electronics; has e-commerce site. Not listed in 2021, but relisted in 2025	2018	
Greenhills Shopping Center	Physical	San Juan, Manila, Philippines	Sells various counterfeit goods	2018	
Gorbushkin Dvor Trade Center / Mall	Physical	Moscow, Russia	Known for its high volume of counterfeit electronics, un-cooperative local authorities	2019	
Sadovod Market	Physical	Moscow, Russia	Sells various counterfeit goods	2018	
MBK Center	Physical	Bangkok, Thailand	Sells counterfeit fashion accessories in temporary stalls on higher-level floors despite frequent police raids	2025	
Aksaray	Physical	Istanbul, Turkey	Center for trafficking and selling counterfeit goods from China into European and Middle Eastern markets	2025	
Tahtakale	Physical	Istanbul, Turkey	Sells counterfeit clothing, shoes, and consumer electronics	2021	
Markets in Deira district	Physical	Dubai, United Arab Emirates	Many IP-infringing markets, known to locals and many tourists	2019	
Gia Lâm	Physical	Hanoi, Vietnam	Gia Lâm market sell counterfeit clothing and fashion accessories both through retail sales and wholesale distribution	2025	
Saigon Square Shopping Mall	Physical	Ho Chi Minh City, Vietnam	Sells counterfeit luxury fashion items and electronics, mainly attracting tourists and domestic travelers	2025	

== Previously listed markets ==
Markets listed here were previously included in various reports, but were not included in subsequent reports. The reason for delisting is not always known.

Name	Type	Location	Status	Notes	Year listed	Year delisted	References
2embed	Online	Vietnam	Shutdown	Database of copyright-infringing content; taken down along with MegaCloud, VidCloud, and RapidCloud	2021	2023	
4shared	Online	Brazil	Unknown	Not listed in 2018 report	2016	2018	
Amarutu	Online	Seychelles	Unknown	Hosting provider for criminal sites, not listed in 2025 report	2022	2025	
Amazon (foreign domains)	Online	Various	Reformed	Only applied to domains amazon.ca, amazon.co.uk, amazon.de, amazon.fr, and amazon.in	2019	2021	
AliExpress	Online	China	Unknown	Listed due to "a significant increase in counterfeit goods being offered for sale," not listed in 2025 report	2021	2025	
BeeVideo	Online	China	Unknown	IPTV application, not listed in 2017 report	2016	2017	
BeoutQ	Online	Saudi Arabia	Shutdown	Reasons for shutdown unknown	2018	2019	
BestBuyIPTV	Online	Italy	Unknown	Offers illegal IPTV services; unrelated to Best Buy, not listed in 2025 report	2019	2025	
BlueAngelHost	Online	Bulgaria	Unknown	Not listed in 2022 report	2020	2022	
Bukalapak	Online	Indonesia	Unknown	E-commerce site selling counterfeit goods, not listed in 2025 report	2018	2025	
Carousell	Online	Singapore	Unknown	Not listed in 2020 report	2018	2020	
Chaloos	Online	Iraq	Unknown	Owns and operates companies involved in media piracy, not listed in 2025 report	2020	2025	
Chomikuj	Online	Netherlands	Unknown	Not listed in 2022 report	2018	2022	
Cimaclub	Online	France, Russia	Unknown	Not listed in 2020 report	2019	2020	
Convert2MP3.net	Online	Unknown	Unknown	Stream ripping site, not listed in 2018 report, shut down in 2019 after legal action	2017	2018	
Dopefile	Online	Bulgaria, Pakistan	Unknown	Not listed in 2018 report	2017	2018	
Dytt8	Online	Taiwan	Unknown	Not listed in 2022 report	2019	2022	
EGY.best	Online	Egypt (reported)	Unknown	Oldest and largest piracy websites in the Middle East and North Africa; not mentioned in 2025 report	2022	2025	
ExtraTorrent	Online	Ukraine	Shutdown	Voluntarily closed in May 2017	2013	2017	
Firestorm	Online	Unknown	Unknown	Not listed in 2020 report	2017	2020	
Fmovies	Online	Ukraine	Unknown	Allows illegal streaming of movies (also known as Bmovies and Bflix); not listed in 2025 report	2017	2025	
Flvto	Online	Netherlands, Russia|style="background: #FF8; color:black; vertical-align: middle; text-align: center; " class="table-maybe"|Unknown	Stream ripping, allows downloading of YouTube videos	2018			
Globe IPTV	Online	Unknown	Unknown	Allows illegal streaming of live sports, movies, and television; not listed in 2025 report	2022	-->	
GoMovies	Online	Vietnam, Ukraine	Shutdown	Shutdown following a criminal investigation in 2018, also known as 123movies	2017	2018	
GongChang	Online	China	Unknown	E-commerce platform known for the sale of counterfeits, not listed in 2017 report	2016	2017	
Hosting Concepts B.V. and Regional Network Information Center JSC	Online	Unknown	Unknown	Not listed in 2021 report	2018	2020	
Haraj	Online	Saudi Arabia	Unknown	Not listed in 2021 report	2020	2021	
IndoXXI	Online	Indonesia	Shutdown	Indonesian government forced IndoXXI to cease operations	2018	2019	
Kinogo	Online	Ukraine	Shutdown	Seized by Ukrainian police	2017	2019	
MercadoLibre	Online	Argentina	Unknown	Not listed in 2021 report	2020	2021	
Movshare Group	Online	Various	Unknown	Includes nowvideo.sx, wholecloud.net, auroravid.to, bitvid.sx, nowdownload.ch, cloudtime.to, mewatchseries.to, and watchseries.ac Not listed in 2018 report	2016	2018	
Movie4k	Online	Russia	Unknown	Not listed in 2018 report	2017	2018	
Mp3va	Online	Russia	Dropped by payment processors	Sold unlicensed music, pretending to be legitimate	2016	2019	
Muaban	Online	Vietnam	Unknown	E-commerce site selling counterfeit apparel and footwear, not listed in 2017 report	2016	2017	
MyEgy	Online	Russia, Egypt	Unknown	Hosts various infringing files, such as pirated video games, not listed in 2017 report	2016	2017	
Nanjing Imperiosus	Online	China	Shutdown	Domain registrar for illegal online pharmacies, closed after being terminated by ICANN	2016	2017	
Openload	Online	Unknown	Shutdown	Shutdown after legal action by the Alliance for Creativity and Entertainment	2017	2019	
Pelispedia	Online	Uruguay	Shutdown	Shutdown by local police and Interpol	2018	2019	
Phimmoi	Online	Vietnam	Unknown	Not listed in 2022 report	2019	2022	
Pobieramy24, Darkwarez, Catshare, and Fileshark	Online	Poland	Unknown	Sites index cyberlockers for searching pirated content, not listed in 2017 report	2016	2017	
Popcorn Time	Online	Numerous	Unknown	Not listed in 2022 report	2020	2022	
Private Layer	Online	Panama, Switzerland	Unknown	Not listed in 2022 report	2016	2022	
Propeller Ads	Online	Cyprus	Unknown	Not listed in 2020 report	2019	2020	
Putlocker	Online	Vietnam	Shutdown	Streaming site for pirated movies and television shows, closed in 2017	2016	2017	
Rebel	Online	Unknown	Unknown	Sells counterfeit pharmaceuticals, not listed in 2018 report	2017	2018	
Repelis	Online	Unknown	Unknown	Not listed in 2018 report	2017	2018	
RevenueHits	Online	Israel	Unknown	Not listed in 2022 report	2020	2022	
Seasonvar	Online	Russia	Unknown	Not listed in 2021 report	2019	2021	
Snapdeal	Online	India	Unknown	Not listed in 2021 report	2019	2021	
Torrentz2	Online	Bulgaria	Unknown	Not listed in 2020 report	2017	2020	
Turbobit	Online	Netherlands	Unknown	Not listed in 2020 report	2017	2020	
TVPlus, TVBrowser, and KuaiKan	Online	China	Unknown	Not listed in 2019 report	2017	2019	
Uploaded	Online	Germany	Unknown	Not listed in 2022 report	2016	2022	
UpToBox	Online	France	Shutdown	Shutdown by local police and ACE	2018	2020	
Vibbo	Online	Spain	Unknown	E-commerce platform selling pirated games and devices to circumvent DRM, not listed in 2017 report	2016	2017	
Youtube-mp3	Online	Germany	Shutdown	Stream ripping site with billions of visitors, closed in 2017 following legal action	2016	2017	
Warmane	Online	Unknown	Unknown	Not listed in 2020 report	2018	2020	
Weidan	Online	China	Listed under parent	Weidan is a "mini program" of WeChat, which was listed in the 2021 report	2020	2021	
Chenghai District, Shantou	Physical	China	Unknown	Manufactures counterfeit goods, not listed in 2017 report	2016	2017	
Cheng Huan Cheng International Auto Parts Market, Beijing	Physical	China	Unknown	Sells counterfeit car parts, not listed in 2017 report	2016	2017	
Hongqiao Market, Beijing	Physical	China	Unknown	Sells various counterfeit goods, not listed in 2018 report	2017	2018	
Ritan Office Building, Beijing	Physical	China	Unknown	Not listed in 2021 report	2020	2021	
La Bahia Market, Guayaqu	Physical	Ecuador	Unknown	Not listed in 2021 report	2018	2021	
Burma Bazaar, Chennai	Physical	India	Unknown	Sells various counterfeit goods and pirated media	2016	2017	
Gandhi Nagar, Delhi	Physical	India	Unknown	Sells counterfeit apparel	2016	2017	
Kashmiri Gate, Delhi	Physical	India	Unknown	Sells counterfeit auto parts	2016	2017	
Millennium Centre, Aizawl	Physical	India	Unknown	Not listed in 2020 report	2019	2020	
Harco Glodok, Jakarta	Physical	Indonesia	Unknown	Sells counterfeit consumer electronics and pirated media, not listed in 2017 report	2016	2017	
Mercato dei venerdi, Ventimiglia	Physical	Italy	Unknown	Sells counterfeit clothing, not listed in 2018 report	2017	2018	
Computer Village Market, Ikeja	Physical	Nigeria	Unknown	Sells counterfeit computers and accessories, not listed in 2017 report	2016	2017	
Oke-Arin & Apongbon Markets, Lagos Island	Physical	Nigeria	Unknown	Sells counterfeit drinks and consumer goods, not listed in 2017 report	2016	2017	
Els Limits de La Jonquera, Girona	Physical	Spain	Unknown	Not listed in 2020 report	2018	2020	
MBK Mall	Physical	Thailand	Unknown	Sells various counterfeit products and pirated media, not listed in 2017 report	2016	2017	
Patpong Market, Bangkok	Physical	Thailand	Unknown	Not listed in 2020 report	2018	2020	
Grand Bazaar, Istanbul	Physical	Turkey	Unknown	Not listed in 2021 report	2017	2021	
Barabashova, Kharkiv	Physical	Ukraine	Unknown	Not listed in 2020 report	2019	2020	
DragonMart	Physical	United Arab Emirates	Reformed	Counterfeit goods no longer openly displayed following enforcement by Dubai Police	2017	2019	
Ajman China Mall, Ajman	Physical	United Arab Emirates	Reformed	Counterfeit goods seized by Ajman Department of Economic Development	2017	2021	
Nin Heip Market, Hanoi	Physical	Vietnam	Unknown	Not listed in 2018 report	2016	2018	
Tan Binh Market, Ho Chi Minh City	Physical	Vietnam	Unknown	Not listed in 2018 report	2017	2018	

== See also ==
- Comparison of BitTorrent sites
