= KayiFamily =

Online illegal movie streaming site network

KayiFamily / KayiTribe
- Website type: Online file hosting index
- Available in: English
- Country of origin: Turkey & Pakistan
- Area served: Worldwide
- Editor: (Turkey-based)
- Revenue: Advertising/Donations
- Commercial: Yes
- Registration: Optional
- Users: 1 million at peak
- Launched: est. 2018–2019
- Current status: Online (clones and copy sites are still available)
- Content license: Unlicensed

Kayifamily, also known as Kayi Tribe, is a network of file streaming websites operating platforms featuring Turkish television series of historical and drama genres from Turkey and Pakistan, especially those related to Diriliş: Ertuğrul, Kuruluş: Osman, and Destan, which allow users to watch Turkish series for free. It has gained notoriety as the world's "most popular illegal site," according to ATV and TRT1, a status it has held since 2018.

== Development ==
The site went through several name changes after being shut down from different domains; sometimes the name appeared as "KayiFamilyTV," and other times as "KayiFamilyUK". The original name and URL is kayifamily.com, which changed to other domains, including kayifamily.xyz before redirecting to kayifamily.org and later gomovies.is. It was changed to kayifamily.co.uk and then to kayifamilytv.com before changing to KayiFamily.com, before finally settling on KayiFamily.com and remaining there until shutdown.

In October 2020, the DMCA listed KayiFamily in its Online Notorious Markets overview to the Office of the United States Trade Representative (USTR), stating that the site had a global Alexa rank of 559 and a local rank of 386 in the U.S. KayiFamily.to had 2.26 million worldwide unique visitors in August 2021, according to SimilarWeb data. In October 2021, Similarweb reported that KayiFamily.com was the "most-used pirate website" in the United Kingdom.

KayiFamily included HD, HD-RIP, Blu-ray, and camera qualities of series. The video hosters and players it used included Openload, Streamango, and MyCloud. However, due to frequent DMCA takedown requests, the site had to constantly change its domain names to evade legal action. Despite these challenges, the site remained active and continued to provide its services, adapting to various domain changes.

In December 2022, the creators of KayiFamily launched another streaming site dedicated to anime, named KayiFamilyTV, which remained on top for months after KayiFamily ongoing DMCA concerns. The site continued to operate and serve its user base, albeit under different domain names and aliases.

== Reappearance ==
In October 2021, the MPAA's update on Online Notorious Markets to the United States Trade Representative stated that the closure of KayiFamily, KayiFamilyHub, KayiStream, and KayiFamilyTV, on foot of a criminal investigation in Pakistan and Turkey in 2018, was "an important development" in combatting illegal film piracy services, especially after increased pressure from ATV and TRT1. However, the MPAA report also noted that numerous copycat sites had emerged in at least eight other countries under the KayiFamily banner, despite ongoing DMCA takedown efforts and the website being blocked in the UK.

In November 2018, sites connected or similar to KayiFamily, such as WatchAsap, had also been shut down by the FBI but were redirecting to other file sharing sites, indicating a persistent challenge in combating online piracy through DMCA actions. While the website remained blocked in the UK, numerous clones proliferated in India in 2018, all under the KayiFamily brand, as authorities in various regions struggled to address the issue of copyright infringement.

== See also ==
- FMovies
- List of websites blocked in the United Kingdom
- Putlocker, similar online movie streaming network
- YIFY Torrents (or YTS), online movie file downloading network
- Popcorn Time, a freeware program allowing users to watch movies through torrenting on several platforms.
