= List of websites blocked in the United Kingdom =

This is a list of websites blocked in the United Kingdom.

== Sanctioned websites ==
As part of UK sanctions against Russia, ISPs are required to take "reasonable steps to prevent" users accessing "an internet service provided by" a person or organisation sanctioned by the UK government. This effectively means blocking websites operated by such organisations. Organisations sanctioned are currently TV Novosti and Rossiya Segodnya. The websites currently listed by the UK government are:

- rt.com
- sputniknews.com
- rossiyasegodnya.com

== Court ordered implementations targeting copyright and trademark infringement ==
Sites are blocked using various methods across the "Big 5" UK ISPs, in accordance with Section 97A of the Copyright, Designs and Patents Act 1988, making it difficult to ascertain the extent to which a site is 'blocked' or not. In December 2014, the affected ISPs decided to publish more information about the blocking orders they received.

In the past, if a user visited a blocked site within the United Kingdom, they were forwarded to a website which included a list of blocked domains and court orders.

ISPs with over 400,000 subscribers subject to blocking orders include:

- BT Group
- EE
- Sky Broadband
- TalkTalk
- Virgin Media

Site name (s)	Domain (s) or URL (s)	Type of site (s)	Reason (s)	Was blocked by	Implementation date
The Pirate Bay	thepiratebay.org; thepiratebay.se	File sharing	Copyright	BPI court order	May 2012
Fenopy; H33t; KickassTorrents	fenopy.eu; h33t.com; kat.ph	File sharing	Copyright	BPI court order	March 2013
Movie2k	movie2k.to	File sharing	Copyright	BBFC court order	May 2013
Download For All	dl4all.com	File sharing	Copyright	MPAA court order	May 2013
EZTV	eztv.it	File sharing	Copyright	MPAA court order	July 2013
First Row Sports	firstrow1.eu	Streaming	Copyright	Premier League court order	July 2013
1337x; Abmp3; BeeMPS; BitSnoop; Bomb-Mp3; eMp3World; ExtraTorrent; File Crop; FilesTube (unblocked in 2014); Monova; Mp3 Juices; Mp3lemon; Mp3 Raid; Mp3skull; New Album Releases; Rapid Library; Torrent Crazy; Torrent Downloads; Torrent Hound; Torrent Reactor; Torrentz	1337x.org; abmp3.com; beemp3s.org; bitsnoop.com; bomb-mp3.com; emp3world.cc; extratorrent.cc; filecrop.com; filestube.com; monova.org; mp3juices.com; mp3lemon.org; mp3raid.com; mp3skull.com; newalbumreleases.net; rapidlibrary.com; torrentcrazy.com; torrentsdownload.org; torrenthound.com; torrentreactor.net; torrentz.eu	File sharing	Copyright	BPI court order	October 2013
PrimeWire; Project Free TV; Putlocker; Vodly; WatchFreeMovies	free-tv-video-online.me; primewire.ag; putlocker.is; vodly.to; watchfreemovies.ch	File sharing; Streaming	Copyright	MPAA court order	November 2013
Solar Movie; Tube +	solarmovie.so; tubeplus.me	Streaming	Copyright	MPAA court order	November 2013
Megashare; Viooz; Watch32; Zmovie	megashare.info; viooz.co; watch32.com; zmovie.co	Streaming	Copyright	MPAA court order	March 2014
Various	1iwc.com; cartierloveonline.com; hotcartierwatch.com; iwcwatchtop.com; montblancpensonlineuk.com; replicawatchesiwc.com; ukmontblancoutlet.co.uk	Luxury goods	Counterfeit goods	Cartier International; Montblanc and Richemont court order	October 2014
bittorrent.am; Bit Torrent Scene; BTDigg; Btloft.com; limetorrents; nowtorrents; Pick Torrent; Seedpeer; torlock; Torrentbit; Torrentdb; Torrent download; Torrent Express; Torrent Funk; Torrent Project; Torrent Room; Torrents.net; Torrent Us; Torrentz.cd; Torrent Zap; Vitorrent	bittorrent.am; btdigg.org; btloft.com; bts.to; limetorrents.com; nowtorrents.com; picktorrent.com; seedpeer.me; torlock.com; torrentbit.net; torrentdb.li; torrentdownload.ws; torrentexpress.net; torrentfunk.com; torrentproject.se; torrentroom.com; torrents.net; torrentus.eu; torrentz.cd; torrentzap.com; vitorrent.org	File sharing	Copyright	BPI court order	October 2014
BitSoup; Cucirca; Demonoid; Heroturko; Ice Films; IP Torrents; Isohunt; Iwannawatch; Iwatchonline; Los Movies; Movie25; Rapid Moviez; RARBG; Scene Source; Seventorrents; Stream TV; Sumotorrent; Tor Movies; Torrent Day; torrent.cd; Torrentbutler; TorrentBytes; Torrenting; Torrents.fm; Torrentz.pro; TV Chaos UK; Vertor; Warez BB; Watchseries-online; watchseries.lt; watchseries.to; YourBittorrent	bitsoup.me (Note: Site with no public file listings.); cucirca.eu; demonoid.ph; heroturko.me; icefilms.info; iptorrents.com; isohunt.to; iwannawatch.to; iwatchonline.to; losmovies.tv; movie25.cm; rapidmoviez.com; rarbg.com; scenesource.me; seventorrents.re; tv-series.me; sumotorrent.sx; tormovies.org; torrentday.com; torrent.cd; torrentbutler.eu; torrentbytes.net; torrenting.com; torrents.fm; torrentz.pro; tvchaosuk.com; vertor.eu; warez-bb.org; watchtvseries.to; watchseries.lt; watchseries.to; yourbittorrent.com	File sharing	Copyright	MPAA court order	November 2014
Bursalagu; Fullsongs; Mega-Search; Mp3.li; Mp3Bear; MP3Boo; Mp3Clan; Mp3 Monkey; Mp3Olimp; MP3s.pl; Mp3soup; Mp3Truck; Musicaddict; My Free MP3; Plixid; RnBXclusive; STAFA Band		File sharing	Copyright	BPI court order	March 2015
AvaxHome; Bookfi; Bookre; Ebookee; Freebookspot; Freshwap; Library Genesis		Ebook file sharing	Copyright	The Publishers Association court order	May 2015
Couchtuner; MerDB; Putlocker; Putlocker Plus; Rainierland; Vidics; Watchfree; Xmovies8				Members of the MPAA (Motion Picture Association of America)	May 2016
123Movies; GeekTV; GenVideos; GoWatchSeries; HDMovie14; HDMoviesWatch; TheMovie4U; MovieSub; MovieTubeNow; Series-Cravings; SpaceMov; StreamAllThis; WatchMovie		Streaming	Copyright	Members of the MPAA (Motion Picture Association of America)	October 2016
Various target servers				The Football Association Premier League Limited ("FAPL")	March 2017 (expired May 2017)
Various target servers				The Football Association Premier League Limited ("FAPL")	July 2017
Couchtuner.fr; Couchtuner.video; FMovies; MyWatchSeries.ac; SockShare; WatchEpisodeSeries.com; WatchSeries.do; WatchSeries-Online.pl; YesMovies; Yify-Torrent		Streaming and File Sharing	Copyright	1. Twentieth Century Fox Film Corporation; 2. Universal City Studios Productions LLP; 3. Warner Bros. Entertainment Inc.; 4. Paramount Pictures Corporation; 5. Disney Enterprises, Inc.; 6. Columbia Pictures Industries, Inc.	November 2017
Team Xecutor; Team Xecutor SX; SX Cart: stargate3ds	stargate3ds.org; xecuteros.com; sxflashcart.com	Nintendo Switch sites	Copyright		2019
Sci-Hub	sci-hub.se	Scientific journal and article sharing	Copyright	Elsevier Limited; Springer Nature Limited	February 2021
NitroFlare	nitroflare.com	File Sharing	Copyright	BPI court order	February 2021
TinyZone; Watch Series; Levidia; EUROPIX HD	tinyzonetv.to; watchserieshd.stream; watchserieshd.ru; watchserieshd.org; levidia.ch; europixhd.pro; europixhd.net	Streaming	Copyright	MPAA court order	October 2021
TvShows88; Soap2day; Sflix; Onionplay; Hurawatch; Gototub; FmoviesFlixhq; Cmovies; BFLIX	tvshows88.live; tv88.to; soap2day.video; onionplay.se; gototub.net; Hurawatch.ru; Onionplay.se; Sflix.to; fmovies.co; Flixhq.ru; cmovies.so; bflix.to	Streaming	Copyright	MPAA court order	January 2022
NSWROM; NSW2U	nswrom.com; nsw2u.net; nsw2u.org; nsw2u.com; nsw2u.xyz	Streaming	Copyright	Nintendo court order	2021
SolarMovie; Gmovies	solarmovie.pe; solarmovies.win; solarmovies.ms; solarmovies.cyou; solarmovies.space; solarmovies.cloud; solarmovies.quest; solarmovieshd.org; solarmovie123.net; solarmovie.zone; solarmovie.id; solarmovie.fun; solarmovie-online.cam; real-solarmovie.com; solarmovies.video; solarmovie-free.com; solarmovie.vip; best-solarmovie.pro; gmovies.cc	Streaming	Copyright	MPAA court order	2023
Gfxtra; 1hd.to	gfxtra31.com; 1hd.to	File Sharing	Copyright	MPAA court order	July 2023
Get Into PC; Filecr; Gfx Mountain; Ymovies; 123 Movies	getintopc.com; filecr.com; gfxmountain.com; ymovies.vip; 123movies.info	Streaming and File Sharing	Copyright	MPAA court order	August 2023
SoftProber; 4Download; SoftCamel; FullVersionDL; Heaven32; Taiwebs; SoffBuff; Getpczone; AudioSEX; Pesktop; MaGeSY; Putlocker	softprober.com; 4download.net; softcamel.com; fullversiondl.com; heaven32.com; taiwebs.com; softbuff.com; getpczone.com; audiosex.pro; pesktop.com; magesy.blog; putlocker.boo	File Sharing	Copyright	MPAA court order	August 2023
SolarMovie; GoMovies; FMovies; Putlocker; MovieRulz; MyAsianTV	solarmovie.one; solarmovie.cr; solarmovie.to; fmovies.fo; putlockers.fm; putlockers.do; gomovies.tw; 4movierulz.to; myasiantv.tv	Streaming	Copyright	MPAA court order	September 2023

=== Indirect blocking ===
In furtherance of the above-mentioned goal of restricting access to The Pirate Bay and similar sites, the BPI believes that "ISPs are required to block the illegal sites themselves, and proxies and proxy aggregators whose sole or predominant purpose is to give access to the illegal sites." As such, sites linking to sites which acted as proxies to The Pirate Bay were themselves added to the list of banned sites, including piratebayproxy.co.uk, piratebayproxylist.com and ukbay.org. This led to the indirect blocking (or hiding) of sites at the following domains, among others:

- 030421678943105436 08954317678950.com
- argentinabay.info
- bayproxy.pw
- belgiumbay.info
- denmarkbay.info
- fattorrents.ws
- finlandbay.info
- germanybay.info
- greecebay.info
- hizliresim.com
- indiabay.info
- indonesiabay.info
- iranbay.info
- irelandbay.info
- italybay.info
- magnetsearch.net
- magnetsearch.org
- mctorrents.se
- netherlandsbay.info
- norwaybay.info
- pbproxy.com
- piratehole.com
- pirateproxies.info
- pirateproxies.net
- pirateproxies.org
- pirateproxy.wiki
- pirateproxybay.com
- piratetavern.net
- piratetavern.org
- piratewiki.info
- proxypirate.pw
- saudiarabiabay.info
- singaporebay.info
- swedenbay.info
- themeatbay.com
- thenewbay.org
- thepirateproxy.co
- theproxy.pw
- tpbay.co
- tpblite.com
- tpbproxy.cc
- tpbproxy.pw
- turkeybay.info
- ukbay.info
- unblockbay.com
- unblockthepiratebay.net
- unblockthepiratebay.org

== Resolved and erroneous blocks ==
Site name (s)	Domain (s) or URL (s)	Type of site (s)	Reason (s)	Blocked by	Start date	Resolution date
Wikipedia	Virgin Killer record album article on en.wikipedia.org	Online encyclopedia	Potentially indecent image of underage child	Internet Watch Foundation	5 December 2008	9 December 2008 (Unblocked by IWF)
Wayback Machine	archive.org	Web archive	Site incompatibility with Cleanfeed	Internet Watch Foundation	14 January 2009	16 January 2009
FileServe	fileserve.com	File hosting	Mistake	Internet Watch Foundation	16 November 2011	18 November 2011
NewzBin2	newzbin.com later newzbin.es	Usenet file search	Copyright	Motion Picture Association court order	1 November 2011	November 2012 (Site closed)
WordPress.com	Several servers of wordpress.com	Blog hosting	Mistake	ISP(s)	17 July 2013	29 July 2013
TorrentFreak	torrentfreak.com	News site	Technical implementation	Premier League court order — Sky Broadband	7 August 2013	9 August 2013
Radio Times and hundreds more	radiotimes.com plus many more	DNS provider and its customers	Technical implementation	Premier League court order	13 August 2013	14 August 2013
Imgur	Specific address range(s) used by imgur.com	Image hosting	Technical issue with content lock system	EE	October 2013	22 November 2013 (Technical problem resolved)
WordPress.com	Several servers of wordpress.com	Blog hosting	Mistake	ISP(s)	26 November 2013	5 December 2013
Imgur	imgur.com	Image hosting	Technical implementation	Sky Broadband	14 December 2013	16 December 2013
WordPress.com	Several servers of wordpress.com	Blog hosting	Mistake	ISP(s)	12 March 2014	16 March 2014
Imgur	imgur.com	Image hosting	Technical fault	Virgin Media	20 May 2016	20 May 2016
Imgur	imgur.com	Image hosting	Technical fault	Virgin Media	15 July 2019	15 July 2019

== See also ==
- Anti-Counterfeiting Trade Agreement (ACTA)
- Censorship in the United Kingdom
- Computer and network surveillance
- Copyright infringement
- Copyright law of the United Kingdom
- Copyright law of the European Union
- Child abuse image content list
- Digital Economy Act 2010
- Digital Economy Act 2017
- File sharing in the United Kingdom
- Internet censorship in the United Kingdom
- Internet Watch Foundation and Wikipedia
- Legal aspects of file sharing
- Web blocking in the United Kingdom
- Internet in the United Kingdom
