= HiAnime =

Defunct file streaming website

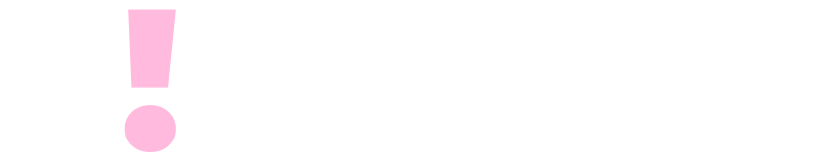
- Website type: File streaming
- Available in: English
- Headquarters: Vietnam
- Registration: Optional
- Launched: 2024
- Current status: Offline (shutdown on 14 March 2026)

HiAnime, (formerly Zoro.to and Aniwatch.to) sometimes stylized as H!Anime, was an anime-focused file streaming website that hosted links and embedded videos, allowing users to stream movies and TV shows illegally for free. It operated under its current name from 2024 to 2026.

The site was believed to be operated from Vietnam.

== History ==
The website was formerly known as Zoro.to, which rebranded as Aniwatch in July 2023, and again to HiAnime (sometimes stylized as H!Anime) in March 2024. At that time, it was already described as "massively popular", while Zoro.to was already called "almost certainly the world's largest pirate site" a year before. HiAnime rose to further prominence after the closure of a similar platform, AniWave, in August 2024, within months becoming one of the most trafficked websites on the Internet; in October 2024 it had a record 364 million monthly visits and a global rank of #120. The numbers dropped subsequently (as of February 2026, it was ranked as the #219 most popular website on the Internet, with over 150 million monthly visits), although it was still considered one of the leading streaming websites, attracting more viewers than legal competitors like Crunchyroll or Disney+. Approximately 40% of its visits came from the United States, and a quarter from India. The website popularity was attributed to its no-fee model, as well as to a vast library of titles, surpassing that of legal competitors whose libraries are limited by licensing.

On 13 March 2026, it went offline with the caption "It's time to say goodbye. And thank you for a wonderful journey with great moments.".

== Legal troubles ==
As an illegal streaming site, the website has been the target of complaints and actions from bodies such as Alliance for Creativity and Entertainment (ACE). In early March 2026, a few days before the website was shut down, the U.S. Trade Representative added HiAnime to its annual list of notorious piracy markets.

On June 1, the website permanently shut down.

On 30 October 2026, the Supreme People's Procuracy of Vietnam announced the prosecution of 7 suspects believed to be the operators of HiAnime, Zoro, and Aniwatch on copyright infringement and money laundering charges. The 7 suspects were Nguyễn Đình Minh Khoa, Nguyễn Trung Anh, Nguyễn Hoàng Thanh, Nguyễn Đình Xuân, Doãn Thành Luân, Nguyễn Khương Duy, and Nguyễn Phước Toàn. Nguyễn Đình Minh Khoa was named as the main perpetrator of this operation. The operation was conducted after a Vietnamese law firm, authorized by the Motion Picture Association, filed a report to the Ministry of Public Security (Vietnam) on 7 May 2026.

== See also ==
- AniWave – File streaming website (2016–2024)
  - KissAnime – Anime-focused file streaming site (2012–2020)
- Nyaa Torrents – File sharing website focused on East Asian media
