= AniWave =

File streaming website (2016–2024)

- Website type: File streaming
- Available in: English
- Editor: anonymous
- CEO: Anime
- Employees: 21
- Website: https://aniwave.lu/
- Registration: Optional
- Launched: 2016
- Current status: online

AniWave (also Aniwave, formerly, 9anime) was a streaming website that had TV shows illegally for free. It operated from 2016 to 2024.

The website was related to a chain of similar websites known as FMovies and had connections to individuals or operations in Vietnam.

== History ==
The website was initially known as 9anime. It was founded in 2016, and in 2023 rebranded itself to AniWave. The reason for the name change was likely that the success of 9anime was attracting increased attention from copyright enforcement agencies, so the site changed the name to delay being sued for piracy. Some fake clones using the old name have appeared in the aftermath of this. Throughout its existence, the website had several domains, most recently it used a .to domain associated with the Kingdom of Tonga.

The site has been targeted by copyright enforcement organizations such as Alliance for Creativity and Entertainment several times, including in 2022 and in 2023.

On the 27th of August 2024, the service was shut down, together with several related websites. Most of the sites features, such as searching, streaming, and downloading were unavailable, but users were still able to export bookmarks for a brief period of time, before the site fully went offline. The website, along with many related television/movie piracy websites related to it, shortly had a goodbye message displayed, with the music video of Wiz Khalifa and Charlie Puth's "See You Again" located at the bottom of it. It reflected on the history of the website, and encouraged users to switch to legal services to support creators. On 29 August 2024, Alliance for Creativity and Entertainment confirmed that they had assisted the Vietnamese police in shutting down the site and many other connected sites including FMovies.

== Significance ==
The website was widely popular. In October 2020, TorrentFreak called it "a major player in anime piracy" with over 39 million visits per month. In May 2023 TorrentFreak described it as a "piracy behemoth" with 214 million visits a month and "huge, successful, and a prime target" for copyright enforcement. In August that year it described the website as "one of the world's largest piracy sites" and "one of... anime piracy juggernauts" although quoting a smaller number of monthly visits (110 million). In 2023 its .to domain was ranked #164 globally, with over 30% of that traffic coming from the United States. A year later, it reported that "it serviced a mind-blowing 170 million visits a month".

The Tech Report described the site as "one of the world's most visited movie streaming websites" and praised the website for being free (including ad-free), its width of coverage, as well as various useful features (such as a list of favorites and watchlists), noting that it however lacks options to download content and a dedicated mobile app. Dataconomy called it "a significant player in the anime streaming space". The Escapist noted that it was "important to the anime community", particularly as legal services are not available to everyone. Distractify noted that the site's closure "has left [anime] fans reeling", as legal services suffer from "increasing prices and somewhat limited range of [content]".

== See also ==
- KissAnime – Anime-focused file streaming site (2012–2020)
- Limewire – Peer-to-peer file sharing application
- Nyaa Torrents – File sharing website focused on East Asian media
- Online piracy – Illegal use of digital copyrighted works
- Scanlation – Fan translation of comics, often manga
- The EmuParadise – Website that hosted video game ROMs
- The Pirate Bay – Website providing torrent files and magnet links
- Warez scene – Organized network of pirate groups
