= Napster =

Online peer-to-peer file sharing software

- Napster running under Windows around July 2000
- Developer: Shawn Fanning; Sean Parker
- Release: June 1, 1999; 27 years ago
- Final release: September 3, 2002; 24 years ago
- Operating system: Cross-platform
- Available in: Multilingual
- Type: Media player
- License: Proprietary
- Website: www.napster.com

Napster was a proprietary peer-to-peer file sharing application primarily associated with the distribution of digital audio files such as MP3s. It was launched in June 1999 by Shawn Fanning and Sean Parker. Due to lawsuits alleging copyright infringement, Napster was shut down in July 2001 and filed for bankruptcy in June 2002.

Napster's intellectual property was acquired by Roxio for $5.3 million in November 2002 and it was relaunched under a subscription business model. In September 2008, Napster was purchased by Best Buy for $121 million. It was sold to Rhapsody in December 2011. In 2016, Rhapsody was renamed Napster. In 2022, Napster was acquired by two Web3 companies, Hivemind and Algorand. In March 2025, Napster was sold to Infinite Reality. In 2026, it was relaunched as an artificial intelligence tool.

== History ==
Napster was launched in June 1999 by Shawn Fanning and Sean Parker. Its name was inspired by Fanning's high school nickname "Nappy" based on his curled, nappy hair.

Unlike other peer-to-peer file sharing networks such as IRC, Hotline, and Usenet, Napster specialized in MP3 files, had a user-friendly interface, and had songs that were difficult to obtain, such as older songs, unreleased recordings, studio recordings, and songs from concert bootleg recordings.

Networks in college dormitories became overloaded, with as much as 61% of external network traffic consisting of MP3 file transfers. Many colleges blocked its use for this reason, even before concerns about liability for facilitating copyright violations on campus.

=== Macintosh version ===
Napster was first launched only for Windows. However, in December 1999, Black Hole Media released a client for the Mac called Macster. Napster acquired Macster and renamed it Napster for the Mac, making it the official Mac Napster client. There were previously other Napster clients for the Mac including MacStar and Rapster.

=== Legal challenges ===
In December 1999, A&M Records along with several other recording companies, through the Recording Industry Association of America (RIAA), sued Napster (A&M Records, Inc. v. Napster, Inc.) on grounds of contributory and vicarious copyright infringement under the Digital Millennium Copyright Act (DMCA).

A demo of Metallica's song "I Disappear" circulated on Napster before the song was officially released and it received radio airplay. In April 2000, the lawsuit Metallica v. Napster, Inc. was filed. The band said it identified 335,000 individuals who were allegedly sharing the band's songs online in violation of copyright laws. The band's attorney's delivered close to 60,000 pages to Napster showing the violations.

A month later, Dr. Dre, who shared a litigator and legal firm with Metallica, filed a similar lawsuit after Napster refused his written request to remove his works from its service.

In June 2000, Madonna's single "Music" was leaked onto Napster prior to its commercial release.

In July 2000, U.S. District Judge Marilyn Hall Patel issued a preliminary injunction requiring Napster to block the sharing of copyrighted music. Napster appealed, and two days later, a panel of judges from the Ninth Circuit issued an emergency stay, pending an appellate hearing.

Some artists supported Napster. In October 2000, Radiohead's album Kid A was leaked on Napster three weeks before the album's official release. The album became the first entry for the band on a U.S. chart and its leak on Napster is credited with spurring sales. Other artists who supported Napster included independent artists such as DJ Xealot, Chuck D from Public Enemy, and Dave Matthews, who, in January 2001, authorized the leaking of his singles onto the platform.

Napster peaked in February 2001.

Verified Napster use peaked with 26.4 million users worldwide in February 2001; however, some unofficial estimates cited a peak of 80 million registered users.

Also in February 2001, Napster offered the record labels a settlement of $1 billion over the next five years, funded by a potential relaunch with a subscription business model. The offer was dismissed.

Also that month, in the case of A&M Records, Inc. v. Napster, Inc., the District Court issued a ruling requiring the lower court to fashion an injunction forcing Napster to stop allowing the sharing of copyrighted works but respecting Napster's technological limits to police activity on its site.

Napster formally petitioned the court for an en banc review by an expanded panel of 11 judges. The appeals court turned down the request, leading to the injunction.

The injunction commanded Napster to keep track of the activities of its network and to restrict access to infringing material when informed of that material's location. The P2P model employed by Napster involved an integral centralized database, hosted by Napster, that indexed a complete list of all songs being shared from connected clients.

Also in July 2001, Napster settled the lawsuits from Metallica and Dr. Dre.

=== Shutdown ===
In early July 2001, Napster shut down its entire network due to the injunction. In mid-July, after Napster agreed to block all but a tiny fraction of unauthorized song-swapping, the 9th U.S. Circuit Court of Appeals temporarily overturned the injunction and allowed Napster to resume operations; however, the service was not restarted.

Following the shut down, alternative decentralized methods of P2P file-sharing emerged, including Gnutella, Freenet, FastTrack, I2P, and BitTorrent.

In September 2001, Napster agreed to pay music creators and copyright owners a $26 million settlement for past, unauthorized uses of music, and as an advance against future licensing royalties of $10 million. To pay those fees, Napster attempted to convert its free service into a subscription business model using the ".nap" secure file format from PlayMedia Systems and audio fingerprinting technology licensed from Relatable. However, Napster was unable to obtain licenses to distribute music from major record labels.

In May 2002, Napster signed an agreement to sell its assets to Bertelsmann for $85 million, which would relaunch Napster under a subscription business model. The two companies had been collaborating since October 2000 when Bertelsmann became the first major label to drop its copyright lawsuit against Napster. Pursuant to the terms of the acquisition agreement, in June 2002 Napster filed for bankruptcy under Chapter 11, Title 11, United States Code.

In September 2002, a bankruptcy judge blocked the sale to Bertelsmann because he ruled the deal was tainted by a conflict of interest. Napster's CEO, Konrad Hilbers, was a former high-ranking executive for Bertelsmann who maintained divided loyalties during the buyout negotiation.

Napster then appointed a Chapter 11 trustee to sell off remaining assets through an auction process, avoiding a Chapter 7 bankruptcy.

In an article published in Rolling Stone in 2018, Kirk Hammett of Metallica upheld the band's opinion that suing Napster was the "right" thing to do.

=== Reiterations ===
In November 2002, Napster's brand and logos were acquired at a bankruptcy auction by Roxio for $5.3 million. Roxio acquired PressPlay in May 2003 from Vivendi Universal and Sony for $40 million. At the time, Pressplay had licenses for more than 250,000 tracks from the five major labels and several independent labels. After integrating the services, Roxio launched a revamped Napster in October 2003, whereby users were able to download songs a-la-carte or pay for a monthly unlimited download and streaming media service. Users were also able to share playlists and browse other users' libraries. Upon its launch, the service had licenses for 500,000 songs.

Also in October 2003, Roxio partnered with Samsung to create a Napster-branded Samsung YEPP portable media player for MP3s powered by a lithium-polymer battery. It used a special version of Napster software and drivers to transfer DRM-protected files to the built-in hard disk.

In May 2006, Napster launched Free Napster, a free, advertising-supported Web-based music player that enabled users to stream full-length versions of all the songs in Napster's catalog of over 8 million tracks three times each, without downloading any software or making any service commitment. Visitors could also purchase DRM-free MP3 downloads. It was discontinued in March 2010.

In September 2008, after introducing its Insignia line of portable media players, Best Buy acquired Napster for $121 million. At that time, Napster was incurring significant losses due to new competition and had approximately 760,000 subscribers. In January 2010, after losing subscribers, the CEO position, held by Chris Gorog, was eliminated.

In December 2011, Napster was sold to Rhapsody, with Best Buy receiving a minority stake in Rhapsody. Rhapsody was created and launched by Listen.com in December 2001 as the first streaming on-demand music subscription service to offer unlimited access to a large library of digital music for a flat monthly fee, using technology from its acquisition of TuneTo.com in April 2001. RealNetworks acquired Listen.com in August 2003 and completed the corporate spin-off of the company in April 2010. By March 2011, it had 750,000 subscribers.

In July 2016, Rhapsody phased out the Rhapsody brand and changed the name of its streaming service to Napster. Napster was sold to virtual reality concerts company MelodyVR in 2020, to Hivemind and Algorand in 2022, and to Infinite Reality in 2025. In January 2026, the Napster music streaming service was shut down and relaunched as an artificial intelligence tool. Record labels and artists claimed they were still owed royalties from the streaming service.

== In popular media ==
- Books that document the experiences of people working at Napster include:
  - All the Rave: The Rise and Fall of Shawn Fanning's Napster (2003) by Joseph Menn
  - Sonic Boom: Napster, MP3, and the New Pioneers of Music (2001) by John Alderman
  - Appetite for Self Destruction: The Spectacular Crash of the Record Industry in the Digital Age (2009) by Steve Knopper
- The Italian Job (2003) features Napster co-founder Shawn Fanning in a cameo as himself. This gave credence to one character's fictional back-story as the original "Napster".
- The South Park episode "Christian Rock Hard" (2003) satirizes the lawsuits against Napster.
- The Social Network (2010) features Napster co-founder Sean Parker, played by Justin Timberlake, in the rise of Facebook.
- Downloaded (2013) is a documentary about sharing media on the Internet and includes the history of Napster.
- How Music Got Free (2024), a documentary based on the non-fiction book How Music Got Free mentions file sharing on the Internet with mentions of Napster and other applications.

== See also ==
- Album era – 1960s–2000s period in the music industry
- BitTorrent – Peer-to-peer file sharing protocol
- Didiom – Peer-to-peer audio place shifting service
- Gnutella – Large peer-to-peer network by Nullsoft
- KissAnime – Anime-focused file streaming site (2012–2020)
- LimeWire
- Scour Inc. – Former multimedia Internet search engine company
- SNOCAP – Legal music service founded by the creator of Napster
- EmuParadise – Website that hosted video game ROMs
- The Pirate Bay – Website providing torrent files and magnet links
