= Napster (pay service) =

Music subscription service, 2003–2011

Napster, LLC
- Type: Subsidiary
- Industry: Online music
- Predecessor: PressPlay
- Founded: March 2003; 23 years ago
- Defunct: November 2011
- Fate: Acquired by Rhapsody International Inc.
- Headquarters: Los Angeles, California, United States
- Key people: Mike Davis, CEO
- Products: Napster; Napster to Go; Napster MP3 Store
- Revenue: ▲$111.08 million USD (FY 2007)
- Net income: ▼$36.83 million USD (FY 2007)
- Number of employees: 138 (2007)
- Parent: Roxio (2003–2008); Best Buy (2008–2011)
- Website: www.napster.com

Napster, commonly known as "Napster 2.0", was a music streaming service and digital music store, launched by Roxio in 2003 under the purchased name and trademarks of former free peer-to-peer file sharing software Napster in the aftermath of the latter's 2002 bankruptcy and subsequent shut down after a series of legal actions taken by the RIAA. Roxio purchased Napster and a music streaming service called PressPlay in 2003, to create a new legal online music service that lets users access music through a subscription or on a fee-per-song basis. Napster was later acquired by Best Buy. The service was acquired by rival Rhapsody in 2011.

== History ==
Napster
- Napster 5.0 beta
- Developer: Napster, Inc.
- Stable release: 4.6.3.4 / August 31, 2010; 16 years ago
- Preview release: 5.0 / 2012; 14 years ago
- Operating system: Microsoft Windows, Mac OS X, Linux, Wii U
- Type: Media player
- License: DRM-free MP3, WMA
- Website: Napster.com

=== As a Roxio subsidiary ===
In 2002, Roxio bought the assets of the original Napster at its bankruptcy auction and acquired PressPlay in May 2003 for $40 million. After integrating the services, Roxio launched a revamped Napster in October 2003, whereby users were able to download songs a-la-carte or pay for a monthly unlimited download and streaming media service. Users were also able to share playlists and browse other users' libraries.

==== Napster MP3 player ====
Soon after launching the revamped Napster, Roxio partnered with Korean electronics maker Samsung to create a Napster-branded MP3 player. The player, named Samsung Napster YP-910 came with a 20GB hard disk that ran for ten hours on a lithium-polymer battery. It used a special version of Napster software and drivers to transfer DRM-protected files to the built-in hard disk.

==== Free Napster ====
In May 2006, Napster launched Free Napster, a free, advertising-supported Web-based music player that enabled users to stream full-length versions of all the songs in Napster's catalog of over 8 million tracks three times each, without downloading any software or making any service commitment. Visitors could also purchase DRM-free MP3 downloads. It was discontinued in March 2010.

=== As a Best Buy company ===
In September 2008, after introducing its Insignia line of portable media players, Best Buy acquired Napster for $121 million. At that time, Napster was incurring significant losses due to new competition and had approximately 760,000 subscribers. In January 2010, after losing subscribers, the CEO position, held by Chris Gorog, was eliminated.

=== Purchase by Rhapsody ===
In 2011, Napster was acquired by competing music streaming provider Rhapsody International. In June 2016, as part of a restructuring, Napster's San Francisco offices were closed, and some employees were laid off. Concurrently, Rhapsody announced that it would rebrand as Napster, citing that the name was better-known internationally.

== See also ==
- Windows Media Player
- Streaming media
- Online music store
- MusicStation
- Comparison of media players
