= EZTV =

TV torrent distribution group

- Website type: Torrent index, magnet links provider
- Available in: English
- Area served: Worldwide (except for blocked countries)
- Creator: NovaKing
- Revenue: Advertisements, donations
- Registration: Optional, free
- Launched: May 2005; 21 years ago
- Current status: Online
- Written in: HTML, JavaScript, and PHP

EZTV was a TV torrent distribution group founded in May 2005 and dissolved in April 2015, after a hostile takeover of their domains and brand by "EZCLOUD LIMITED". It quickly became the most visited torrent site for TV shows.

== History ==
=== Founding ===
It was founded in response to the forced disappearance of TVTorrents.tv and btefnet via lawsuit. The group was founded by NovaKing with a loose coalition of volunteers and held no formal ties to its predecessors.

In the aftermath of the takedown of TVTorrents and btefnet, the BitTorrent community felt a need for a site that moderated its content. The two groups were known to never provide any fake links, a problem that used to be quite prevalent on public bittorrent sites prior to improvements in community-powered filtering in recent years. A group of volunteers gathered in the IRC channel #EZTV on the EFnet IRC network to create a TV torrent group from scratch in order to fill this void in the public bittorrent scene.

The idea behind EZTV was to create a group that would pick up where its two predecessors left off while avoiding what they considered the "weak spots" that had brought them down. This meant that EZTV should never host its own torrent files, its leadership structure should be dynamic and opaque to avoid presenting any obvious target for litigation, and the group should not host or run its own tracker.

In addition, it was decided that EZTV should be a purely non-profit group by never asking for money of any kind from its users and to never have advertisements to avoid "profiting from piracy" litigation. This means that EZTV was run entirely on a volunteer basis. This clean, no-ads profile of EZTV has made the site a popular destination for the public torrent scene.

=== EZTVEFNET.org ===
During its first years of operation, EZTV hosted its site under the domain name eztvefnet.org. However, in October 2007 that domain began redirecting to a Google query for "eztv". Citing "administrative issues", EZTV had lost control over that domain and has redirected users to eztv.it. After the Italian authorities took down the EZTV.it domain, users were directed towards eztv.ch.

In April 2008 the old domain name was parked and taken over by a different site.

=== Stability issues ===
By many accounts, EZTV was for a few years plagued with several periods of – sometimes prolonged – downtime.

=== Piratebay Raid ===
On 9 December 2014, The Pirate Bay was raided by the Swedish police, who seized servers, computers, and other equipment and resulted in EZTV going down.

By the 11th of December, EZTV was releasing torrents again, although the main site was not yet accessible with the regular domain; however, the site could be reached through eztv proxy sites. As of 22 December 2014 EZTV was accessible again through the EZTV.ch domain for some weeks.

=== Hostile takeover ===
Since October 2007, EZTV was using the EZTV.it domain name. But under pressure from copyright holders, the Italian .it registry lodged a complaint over some paperwork. Facing a possible confiscation of the EZTV.it domain name, they saw no other option than to switch to a new domain. The EZTV.it domain name was suspended, and a couple of months later was taken over by scammers attempting to claim EZTV as their own. But unlike the real EZTV this .it domain opens windows with advertisements.

As of 25 April 2015, the EZTV.ch and the EZTV-Proxy.net the "semi" accepted proxy are under control of "EZCLOUD LIMITED". Simultaneously with the takeover of the EZTV.ch domain and the EZTV-Proxy.net proxy, the scam group "EZCLOUD LIMITED" started attempts to take over the online identities by impersonating them on their own clone of the original websites, further assimilating the brand name and disrupting the workings and communication of the original group and attempting to gain revenue via an unofficial EZTV Bitcoin and adverts on these hijacked sites. "EZCLOUD LIMITED" gained access to the EZTV.se domain via the registrar and reset Novaking's information, allowing them access to the domain accounts for EZTV. Using this access, they hijacked the EZTV domains and locked Novaking out.

The original EZTV domain was under EZCLOUD LIMITED's control around 29 April 2015. The topic of the IRC channel where EZTV was discussed was set to "DO NOT USE THE SITES! They are not ours anymore. Thanks for all the fish." Around 5 May 2015 Rarbg, BT-Chat, and other sites removed EZTV as an affiliate and took steps to stop indexing "EZCLOUD LIMITED" releases. KickassTorrents, BT-Chat and The Pirate Bay suspended or deactivated the official EZTV accounts and added warnings to the old releases, ex-EZTV staff continue their warnings that people should avoid the scam site that is left behind.

=== Aftermath ===
After the original owner, NovaKing, and his staff called it quits after the hostile takeover, the EZTV branding was used by the members of EZCLOUD LIMITEDEZ under the domain EZTV.io. In 2020 this domain was disabled due to disputes, due to which EZTV switched to a new domain. This resulted in it being blocked in the Netherlands due to it being on the same Cloudflare IP Address as The Pirate Bay. This was later resolved with EZTV being moved to a different IP address.

== Former partners ==
Over the years, EZTV has participated in several partnerships.

=== EZTV and VTV ===
Initially, EZTV and fellow TV torrent distribution group VTV acted as competition across the board but with different approaches. Over time, however, it has become clear that the two groups cooperate in some ways since VTV distributes releases that EZTV does not do via EZTV's IRC channel and website.

=== EZTV and MVGroup ===
In summer of 2008, EZTV and the documentary torrent distribution group MVGroup initiated a partnership that saw MVG's torrents distributed by EZTV on their IRC channel and website. The agreement benefited both sides, as MVG gained increased exposure and a vastly improved seeder base while EZTV expanded the list of shows available through them.

In a statement to TorrentFreak, MVGroup admins said they "would like to take this opportunity to thank EZTV in helping us continue our founder's legacy, to spread high quality educational material via p2p, to everyone, for free (...)".

One month prior to this announcement, MVG's founder Merrin had died after prolonged illness.

=== EZTV and VODO ===
The Creative Commons media distributor VODO has for a long time held a prominent position on the EZTV site. EZTV was one of the first torrent groups to offer VODO exposure to their audience, along with The Pirate Bay, Mininova, isoHunt and others.

== April Fools ==
EZTV Homepage April 1, 2014

One notable exception to the no-fakes mechanic was a 2008 April Fools' Day prank, where a release was posted on EZTV's website purporting to be a DVD screener pre-air release of an episode of the TV-show Lost. This episode was, in fact, an episode of Flavor of Love with an edit at the beginning saying "April Fool's".

A year after the Lost pre-air incident, the group replaced their site with a service dedicated to sports related shows – EZSports. In the aftermath of this prank, many users actually wanted the group to let the EZSports site stay online and be provided as a parallel service to the regular EZTV. The group was initially positive to the idea, but a lack of volunteers to maintain the site stopped it in its tracks.

In 2012 the group pulled another April Fools' Day prank on the community. This time they renamed their releases with the extension .rm (RealMedia) and posted an announcement on the site explaining they had changed the format of their releases in response to "all the comments people have been leaving on our forums" after the Scene changed the encoding of their releases in the weeks prior to the prank.

== ISP Blockade ==
EZTV and its RSS website ezRSS are currently blocked by multiple ISPs in Italy and in the UK at request from MPA and FACT.

As of August 2017, Australian ISP's have also blocked EZTV, amongst others.

== See also ==
- Comparison of BitTorrent sites
- Websites blocked in the United Kingdom
