= Nyaa Torrents =

File sharing website focused on East Asian media

- Website type: Torrent meta-search engine
- Available in: English
- Website: nyaa.si
- Registration: Optional (currently closed)
- Launched: 2005; 21 years ago
- Current status: Online

Nyaa Torrents (named for the Japanese onomatopoeia for a cat's meow) is a BitTorrent website focused on East Asian (Japanese, Chinese, and Korean) media. It is one of the largest public anime-dedicated torrent indexes.

== History ==
In 2011, some users of the site were sued for copyright infringement. The site was a target of a large DDoS attack in early September 2014.

On 1 May 2017, their .se, .eu, and .org domain names were deactivated, with the site's moderators later confirming that the owner took it down voluntarily. In the following weeks, several forks, partially based on Nyaa code and database of torrents, were started, each using "nyaa" in its name.

In the official FAQ posted by the community that surrounded Nyaa, it is said that some data between 2016 and May 2017 was lost, and there was not a reputable backup of the Nyaa database for that time period.

In June 2017, TorrentFreak reported that Germany-based Goodlabs put up a fake version of the .eu site in an attempt to get users to download a "free binary client".

In April 2018, Cloudflare terminated its services to Nyaa. According to Cloudflare, "The pirate site tried to interfere with and thwart the operation of the company's abuse reporting systems."

In 2020 the site was blocked in India, along with other pirate streaming and torrent websites, after a decision by the Delhi High Court in favour of the plaintiff, Disney India. The court order provided for "dynamic" blocking meaning that Disney could ask for further bans on websites violating copyrights other than the ones in the order.

In June 2021, Verizon Fios blocked the website.

In an effort to provide security and to help users access the site, Nyaa released an announcement with recommendations on how to unblock their website. The announcement also warns users against the use of proxy sites, as they can potentially steal information or serve malware.

== Website ==
The site has video source rules, for example, DVD video is limited to a resolution of 1024x576, while UHD is limited to resolutions upwards of 3840×2160. This is for maintaining the original quality of the video.

Users cannot add watermarks, or lower the quality to a worse video codec. "Shitposting" consistently may result in a ban. Content restrictions include having only content from China, Japan, and Korea.

=== Categories ===
Categories are split into Anime, Audio, Literature, Live Action, Pictures, and Software. Each have their own subcategories, for example Audio is split in lossless and lossy.

Users can also use Filters, which filter out the torrents to no remakes and trusted (uploaders) only.

=== Entries ===
Uploads are split into green, red, orange, and grey entries. Green entries are torrents uploaded by trusted users. Red entries (remake) are torrents that match any of the following:

- Reencode of an original release.
- Remix of another uploader's original release for hardsubbing or fixing purposes.
- Reupload of an original release using non-original file names.
- Reupload of an original release with missing or unrelated additional files.

Orange entries are batches of an entire series, and grey entries are hidden torrents.

== See also ==
- KissAnime
- EZTV
- The Pirate Bay
- RuTracker.org
- RARBG
- 1337x
