= TV Links =

User contributed online video directory

- Screenshot of the TV Links front page on 10 October 2007
- Website type: Video directory
- Dissolved: 17 October 2007; 19 years ago
- Owner: David Rock
- Creator: David Rock
- Revenue: Donations and Image Ads
- Website: tv-links.co.uk (defunct)
- Commercial: Yes
- Launched: October 2006; 20 years ago
- Current status: Offline; domain now hosts a different website

TV Links was a user contributed online video directory for television programmes, films, and music videos. In a similar style to BitTorrent trackers such as The Pirate Bay, video content was not hosted by TV Links. Instead, videos were hosted by third-party video sharing websites. The website was operated as a hobby by David Rock of Cheltenham, England.

On 18 October 2007, the website's servers, located in the Netherlands, were raided and shut down by Gloucestershire police in cooperation with the Federation Against Copyright Theft (FACT) in response to complaints received from major US film studios about TV Links. No official clarification has been made to date as to why the website was shut down. Simultaneously, David Rock was arrested and later released pending further investigation, without being charged with a crime. Although FACT initially stated that the raid was performed because of allegations of copyright infringement, it later stated that Rock was arrested for trademark infringement.

== History ==
TV Links launched in October 2006, following a surge in services of its kind. At that time, it provided hyperlinks to videos on video sharing websites.

On about 20 March 2007, the website was updated to use a streaming web-based video player, and direct external links were no longer made available.

=== Shutdown and arrests by UK government ===
On 18 October 2007, owner David Rock was arrested by the Gloucestershire police in cooperation with the Federation Against Copyright Theft (FACT) and the website was shut down.

Initial claims by FACT indicated the arrest was made due to offences of facilitating copyright infringement. However, it was later made clear that the arrest was over a matter of possible trademark infringement.

In a statement issued by FACT following the events, local trading standards head Roger Marles implied that the website's update from hyperlinks to a streaming video player might have affected the shutdown. He stated that the arrest and shutdown were initiated because TV Links allowed users "[to view] any one of a large number of films and television programmes directly via the website. This is illegal under UK copyright law."

Whilst arrested under Section 92 of the Trade Marks Act 1994, he was released pending further investigation with no charges filed against him. Section 92 has been used to prosecute illegal copiers of CDs and DVDs but never in the absence of a physical storage medium. It is unclear whether or not the operation of TV Links was a crime under UK law. In an interview, Rock stated that he would have not started the website if he had found anything in the laws of the country stating that what he was doing was illegal.

== Operation ==
Video content used by the website was hosted by third-party video sharing websites. TV Links used hyperlinks and later a streaming web-based video player, in order to link visitors to videos.

The website had a forum community with a membership of approximately 37,000 members at the time of closure. Links to videos were posted daily on the forums by members and later moved to the website listings by admins.

After the video player was introduced, the website's crew enforced a strict policy against saving the provided video content and viewing it outside the scope of its video player. This policy was further enforced by a technical implementation, the URL that directed the video player to video files contained a randomly generated MD5 encoded string and was made to expire after several minutes, or after being loaded once.

=== Legal efforts ===
The website's servers were purposely located in the Netherlands so that UK copyright law could not apply to them.

As part of the effort to protect the website against legal action, a link to the following legal disclaimer was displayed at the bottom of most pages.

TV Links is not responsible for any content linked to or referred to from these pages. TV Links does not host any content on our Servers. All video links point to content hosted on third party websites. Users who upload to these websites agree not to upload illegal content when creating their user accounts. TV Links does not accept responsibility for content hosted on third party websites.

— TV Links legal disclaimer

== Reception ==
Eva Wiseman of The Guardian had described the practices of linking to copyrighted content as "teetering on the edge of illegality" in an article on similar video directory services. On the other hand, it was speculated that concerns over the popularity of websites such as TV Links were an influence on the launch of official online video on demand services from the UK's terrestrial television networks such as BBC iPlayer and 4od.

== See also ==
- Internet television
- Richard O'Dwyer
- alluc.org
- PeerTube
- Putlocker
- 123Movies
