= David Rock =

David Rock may refer to:

- David Rock (architect) (1929–2025), English architect and graphic designer
- David Rock (historian) (born 1945), historian of Latin America
- David Rock (cricketer) (born 1957), English former cricketer
- David Rock, owner of the company TV Links
- Dave Rock, musician of Rilo Kiley
