= Comparison of BitTorrent sites =

This is a comparison of BitTorrent websites that includes most of the most popular sites. These sites typically contain multiple torrent files and an index of those files.

== Features ==
- BitTorrent sites may operate a BitTorrent tracker and are often referred to as such. Operating a tracker should not be confused with hosting content.
- A directory allows users to browse the content available on a website based on various categories. A directory is also a site where users can find other websites.
- Some sites focus on certain content – such as etree, which focuses on live concerts – and some have no particular focus, like The Pirate Bay. Some sites specialize as search engines of other BitTorrent sites.

== Site comparison ==
The following table compares the features of some of the most popular BitTorrent websites; it is not comprehensive with regard to listing all of the popular BitTorrent trackers, especially private trackers.

Site	Specialization	Is a tracker	Directory	Public	RSS	One-click download	Sortable	Comments	Multi-tracker index	Ignores DMCA	Tor-friendly	Registration
1337x	None	No	Yes	Yes	No	No	Yes	Yes	Yes	No	Yes	Optional
Demonoid	None	Yes	Yes	Yes	No	Yes	Yes	Yes	?	?	Yes	?
etree	Live concerts	Yes	Yes	Yes	Yes	Yes	Yes	Yes	No	?	?	Optional
MVGroup	Documentaries, educational media	Yes	Yes	Yes	Yes	Yes	Yes	Yes	No	Yes	No	Mandatory
Nyaa	East Asian content, especially manga and anime	Yes	Yes	Yes	Yes	Yes	Yes	Yes	No	Yes	No	Optional
The Pirate Bay	None	No	Yes	Yes	Yes	Yes	Yes	Yes	No	Yes	Yes	Optional
RuTracker.org	None	Yes	Yes	Yes	Yes	Yes	Yes	Yes	No	Yes	Yes	Optional
YourBittorrent	None	Yes	Yes	Yes	Yes	Yes	Yes	Yes	Yes	No	No	?
Site	Specialization	Is a tracker	Directory	Public	RSS	One-click download	Sortable	Comments	Multi-tracker index	Ignores DMCA	Tor-friendly	Registration

=== Defunct ===
Site	Specialization	Was a tracker	Directory	Public	RSS	One-click download	Sortable	Comments	Multi-tracker index	Ignored DMCA	Tor-friendly	Registration
BTDigg	None	No	Yes	Yes	No	No	Yes	No	?	?	Yes	No
ETTV	None	Yes	Yes	No	Yes	Yes	Yes	Yes	No	Yes	No	?
EZTV	TV Series	No	Yes	Yes	Yes	Yes	Yes	Yes	No	No	Yes	?
KickassTorrents	None	No	Yes	Yes	No	Yes	No	No	No	No	No	?
RARBG	None	Yes	Yes	Yes	Yes	No	Yes	Yes	Yes	No	No	No
YIFY	Movies	No	Yes	Yes	Yes	Yes	Yes	Yes	No	Yes	Yes	?
What.CD	Music	Yes	Yes	No	Yes	Yes	Yes	Yes	No	Yes	No	Yes
Oink's Pink Palace	Music	Yes	Yes	No	Yes	Yes	Yes	Yes	No	Yes	No	Yes
YggTorrent	None	No	Yes	No	Yes	Yes	Yes	Yes	?	?	Yes	Mandatory
Tamil Rockers	None	?	?	Yes	?	Yes	Yes	Yes	?	Yes	Yes	?
Site	Specialization	Was a tracker	Directory	Public	RSS	One-click download	Sortable	Comments	Multi-tracker index	Ignored DMCA	Tor-friendly	Registration

== See also ==
- List of warez groups
