= Aniwave =

- Aniwave, an anime convention in North Carolina operating from 2007 to 2015
- AniWave (formerly, 9anime), an anime-focused file streaming website that operated from 2016
