= DHgate.com =

Chinese e-commerce marketplace

- Native name: 敦煌网
- Company type: Private
- Industry: Cross-border e-commerce
- Founded: August 2004
- Founder: Diane Wang (CEO)
- Headquarters: Beijing, China
- Number of locations: List: United States; Philippines; Spain; United Arab Emirates; Dongguan; Guangzhou; Harbin; Ningbo; Shanghai; Shanxi; Shenzhen; Yiwu
- Area served: Worldwide
- Products: E-commerce; mobile commerce; logistics platform; cross border payments
- Services: B2B; trade; import; export
- Website: www.dhgate.com

DHgate.com (Chinese: 敦煌网; pinyin: Dūnhuángwǎng) is a Chinese business-to-business (B2B) and Business-to-consumer cross-border e-commerce marketplace that facilitates the sale of manufactured products from suppliers to small and medium retailers. It is one of the largest B2B-cross-border e-commerce trade platforms in China. The company is based in Beijing and has offices worldwide, including in the US and UK.

== History ==
DHgate was founded by Diane Wang in Beijing in August 2004 and was officially launched in 2005. The "DH" in DHgate refers to Dunhuang (Mandarin 敦煌 (Dūnhuáng)), a Chinese city in modern-day Gansu province and formerly a strategic point on the Silk Road which linked China to the rest of the world during ancient times. The name alludes to the company's place as a modern, online version of the Silk Road linking SMEs between China and abroad. Early on, the company struggled to remain profitable, but capital investments in 2006 and 2007 helped DHGate remain afloat. In 2008, it was listed 7th on the Deloitte Technology Fast 50 for the Asia Pacific region. By the following year, it had over 1 million registered users worldwide.

In January 2013, DHgate began assisting small & medium-sized enterprises (SMEs) in Vietnam with exporting goods internationally. Prior to this, the company had primarily worked to connect Chinese SMEs with foreign buyers. DHgate also became the first Chinese cross-border e-commerce company to provide internet financial services.

An April 2014 report by the International Finance Corporation advised Asia-Pacific Economic Cooperation (APEC) economies to follow the company's model. DHgate's founder and CEO, Diane Wang, had been a member of the APEC Business Advisory Council (ABAC) since 2011. In February 2015, access to DHgate was added to the Shopify platform.

In November 2015, DHgate helped facilitate a bilateral e-commerce treaty between Turkey and China at a ceremony during the G20 summit in Antalya that was attended by leaders of both nations and Diane Wang. The agreement was signed as a part of the Chinese government's Belt and Road Initiative. A Sino-Turkish e-commerce platform was established by DHgate (in conjunction with Chongqing Logistics City) in April 2016.

In 2017, the company launched physical stores called Digital Trade Centers (DTCs), which were designed as a temporary experimental service to allow retailers and wholesalers to inspect products prior to purchasing them. DTCs were set up in the United States, Hungary, Australia, Spain, Russia, Turkey, the United Arab Emirates, and Peru, but the service has since been discontinued.

In 2019, DHgate began helping Japanese SMEs sell their products through the platform, and continued its strategy in Turkey to enable suppliers in the country to sell online.

In 2022, the Office of the United States Trade Representative added DHGate to its list of Notorious Markets for Counterfeiting and Piracy.

In April 2024, DHgate Group honored with "Best B2B Cross-Border e-commerce Marketplace Company China 2024" by the Global Finance (magazine).

== Operations ==
DHgate.com is a cross-border business-to-business (B2B) e-commerce platform that links primarily Chinese SMEs to businesses and individuals worldwide. As of June 30, 2020, the platform had 31 million global registered buyers, 2.2 million in sellers and other countries from over 220 countries and regions, and 32 million products available. The website sells a diverse range of products, such as electronics, clothing, health and beauty goods, among others. It is regarded as China's largest digital platform dedicated solely to business-to-business (B2B) transactions, and is available in 8 languages including Chinese, English, Russian, Spanish, German, Portuguese, Italian, and French.

In 2017, DHgate also operated physical locations known as Digital Trade Centers (DTCs) in which prospective clients could inspect goods before ordering. DTCs were located in numerous countries globally as a temporary experimental service but have since been discontinued..

In 2020, DHgate launched MyyShop, a Software-as-a-Service (SaaS) product to build a decentralized cross-border e-commerce industry. Facing the COVID-19 crisis, DHgate accelerated the digital transformation of international traders, connecting global buyers with virtual exhibitions.
