= Diane Wang =

Chinese businesswoman

- Born: Diane Wang Shutong; 1968 (age 57–58); Beijing, China
- Occupation: Businessperson
- Known for: Founder and CEO of DHgate.com

Diane Wang is a Chinese businesswoman who is the founder and current CEO of DHgate.com. She is also the founder of women’s empowerment community The Inner Mountain Foundation, founder of the international women’s entrepreneurship community APEC Women Connect, a Chinese representative on the Asia-Pacific Economic Cooperation (APEC) Business Advisory Council (ABAC), a Chinese representative at the G20 Business Summit (B20), and a Chinese national chapter member of BRICS Women's Business Alliance. In 2018, she was appointed to the High-Level Advisory Council of the World Internet Conference.

== Career ==
Wang graduated from the Beijing University of Posts and Telecommunications in 1991. After graduation, she became a teacher at Tsinghua University. In 1993, she earned a job at Microsoft China. There, she was the manager of marketing services and, later, the director of business development. In 1999, she took a job as a senior manager at Cisco Systems China where she was the only woman on the management team.

In 2000, she resigned her position at Cisco to become the co-founder and CEO of Joyo.com, an online book and video retailer. That company was sold to Amazon in 2004 and became Amazon China. In August 2004, Wang founded the business-to-business cross-border e-commerce website, DHgate.com. It was officially launched in 2005. Early on, funding from venture capital firms started to come in 2006 and 2007. By 2008, the company was listed 7th on the Deloitte Technology Fast 50 for the Asia Pacific region and had 1 million registered buyers by 2009.

In 2011, Wang became China's representative on the APEC Business Advisory Council (ABAC). Soon after, she was named the first rotating chairperson of the APEC SME Service Alliance. She also helped establish the ABAC SME and Entrepreneurship Working Group and the APEC Women's Leadership Forum. She is the co-chair of the former and the chair of the latter. At an ABAC meeting in 2014, Wang helped establish the APEC Cross-Border E-commerce Training (CBET) program which provides capacity building on digital skills to SMEs worldwide. By the end of 2018, DHgate had 19 million buyers and 1.9 million suppliers.

In January 2015, she was appointed as China's representative to the B20 and began serving as the co-chair of the B20 SME Taskforce. In June of that year, she spoke at the Global E-Commerce Summit in Barcelona. In November 2015 during the G20 Summit in Antalya, Turkey, Wang and DHgate helped facilitate a cross-border e-commerce treaty between China and Turkey. Chinese president Xi Jinping and Turkish president Recep Tayyip Erdoğan were present at the signing. A similar agreement between China and Peru was signed at the APEC CEO Summit in 2016. Wang was named co-chair of B20 Digitalization Taskforce and member of B20 Women in Business Action Council in 2020.

In 2016, Wang launched APEC Women Connect as a motivational community for female entrepreneurs in Asia. Together with DHGATE Group, APEC Women Connect co-hosts an annual “Her Power” Entrepreneurship Competition, which brings together female social commerce entrepreneurs from around the world to learn and grow their businesses together via e-learning courses, lectures and contests integrated with DHGATE Group’s MyyShop social commerce platform.

At an ABAC meeting in 2018, Wang proposed the creation of incubation centers throughout Asia to "promote the expansion of small business trade." That year, she was also named a member of the High-level Advisory Council of the World Internet Conference.

In the crisis of COVID-19, Wang advocated on digital equality, gender digital equality, and digital transformation, urging the public and private sectors to work together to weather the storm, particularly for MSMEs and women. She recommended digital transformation for all industries, including building a digitized and resilient global supply chain system and promoting international trade with cross-border e-commerce.

In 2023, Wang founded The Inner Mountain Foundation, a global community that promotes the empowerment of women through education, outreach and group activities. It also provides access to various entrepreneurial resources and funding for women-owned businesses. Centered around self-discovery and mutual upliftment through the concept of ‘holding space’, The Inner Mountain Foundation aims to help women break free of limiting beliefs that hinder their potential. It is built on three unique pillars: "Look Within", "Community" and "International". The Foundation’s name is a direct reference to Wang’s ‘inner mountain’ philosophy, which Wang formulated to help fellow women overcome their limiting beliefs and motivate them to follow their dreams. The Inner Mountain Foundation launched its China chapter in 2023 and its first US chapter in 2024. Wang is also author of a book titled The Inner Mountain, which expands on her ‘inner mountain’ philosophy and how it guides The Inner Mountain Foundation’s direction.
