= Chris Gorog =

William Christopher “Chris” Gorog is an entertainment and technology executive that has served as chairman and chief executive officer of Napster and Roxio.

== Career ==
Gorog was born in Fontainebleau France, raised in Dayton, Ohio, and graduated from San Diego State University with a B.A.S. in telecommunications and film. Gorog comes from an entrepreneurial family. His father, William F. Gorog, was co-founder and chief executive of Data Corp, which created LexisNexis.

Gorog began his entertainment career as a business affairs executive at The Walt Disney Company, continued his work in film and television as CEO of ITC Entertainment, moved to Universal Studios as executive vice president of group operations for the Recreation Group.

In September 2000, Christopher Gorog was appointed Roxio's first President and CEO. He led the company’s successful spin-off from Adaptec, took the company public in May 2001, and drove the creation of the Roxio consumer brand. Roxio became the leader in CD burning software, with 70% market share led by its brands Easy CD Creator and Toast. In January 2002, Gorog led Roxio’s acquisition of MGI Software that expanded the company’s portfolio to include photo and video editing software, as well as the system-recovery software for crash and virus recovery.

In December 2002, Gorog led Roxio’s acquisition of Napster – and followed with an acquisition of Universal Music’s and Sony’s Pressplay in May 2003, which served as the new technology platform for the company’s release of Napster 2.0, the revitalized legal version of the original Napster. In August 2004, Roxio sold the software business in order to focus entirely on developing the Napster digital music business. The company officially changed its corporate name from Roxio (NASDAQ: ROXI) to Napster (NASDAQ: NAPS) in January 2005. Napster assembled one of the largest digital music catalogs in the world and expanded its global presence by offering its service in the U.K, Germany and Japan. Napster created a number of digital music product innovations under Gorog’s management, including the introduction of portable subscriptions, a free advertising supported version of Napster, as well as a variety of mobile music offerings.

Gorog also oversaw the development of a number of advertising campaigns for the company, including “Its Coming Back,” Napster’s re-launch campaign featuring a series of original animations that received both the Cannes Lion Award and the Silver Effie. Napster was also awarded Billboard magazine’s “Best Digital Music Community” award for its U.S. music service.

Best Buy acquired Napster in 2008, and Gorog served as Napster’s chief executive officer until January 6, 2010. He started gorog.net to serve as a foundation to explore new opportunities in entertainment, media and technology.

Gorog was a key ally of the record labels in the digital music market but was also a vocal critic of the licensing terms and DRM restrictions that labels imposed on digital music services.

== Board positions ==
- Director of House of Blues
- Director of Guitar Center
- Director of Critical Path
- Board member of Roxio
- Chairman of Napster
- Director of NARM, the National Association of Recording Merchandisers

== Affiliations ==
- Member of the Young Presidents' Organization
- Member of the Academy of Motion Picture Arts and Sciences

== Keynotes ==
- May 1, 2007 – Digital NARM – Chicago, IL: “Bridging the Gap between Physical and Digital”
- May 1, 2006 – MuseExpo – Hollywood, CA: “Unlimited access – Anytime, Anywhere”
- April 5, 2005 – Leadership Music Digital Summit – Nashville, TN: “Digital Subscriptions: The Future of The Music Industry”
- July 26, 2004 – Jupiter Plug-In – New York, NY: “The State of the Digital Music Industry”
- May 3, 2004 – Financial Times – London, England: “The Best Defense if a Good Offense, The Rise of Legitimate On-Line Music Services”
- April 20, 2004 – Music Board of Ireland and the European Union – Dublin, Ireland: “The Internet & the Democratization of Music”
- December 8, 2003 – iHollywood Forum – Universal City, CA: "Music 2.0"
- July 28, 2003 – Jupiter Plug-In – New York, NY: "The Return of Napster"
- March 3, 2003 – Digital Music Forum – New York, NY: "The Impact of Technology on Music Business Today"
- January 24, 2003 – MidemNet – Cannes, France: "Music and Technology Back on Track"
