= Alluc =

Online video directory

Alluc.ee
- Website type: Online video directory
- Available in: English; German; Spanish
- Owners: All You See Ltd. & Co. KG
- Creator: Sebastian Fink
- Website: http://www.alluc.ee/
- Registration: Optional
- Current status: Discontinued

alluc.ee (pronounced: "all-you-see") was a user-generated online video directory for TV shows, movies, music videos, sport, pornography, anime and cartoons, and later a search engine. Alluc did not host any content itself nor contain any download links; all links were to streaming video sharing websites. Users provided the links in the right category and published links to the site after being reviewed by the administrators. Video hosting sites that were linked to on Alluc included YouTube, Dailymotion, and Veoh, amongst others.

== History ==
Alluc started out as a quest to collect all episodes hosted on popular video hosting websites and to categorize them in one place, thus Allfg.org (standing for: All Family Guy) was founded. Set up in September 2006 by its three German owners, Allfg.org's popularity grew. On this first site the content was not yet automatically submittable. Public awareness of the site was apparently spread by word of mouth.

On October 23, 2006, a forum was set up, where the system of submitting links by the users was improved. In mid-October, the official Alluc.org website launched. This site was a big improvement because the links were directly submittable and dead links could be reported when logged in. A logo competition was started December 29, 2006 and spawned massive response from the site visitors. The logo was chosen through a democratic voting system by all visitors.

Several automated scripts were developed to aid in the detection of 'false links' and redundant copies of links. These scripts are activated periodically to effectively clean the database.

The popularity of the site has spawned other similar sites, such as TV Links (which was shut down by a legal challenge in August 2007).

=== 2014 relaunch as search engine ===
In 2014 the site relaunched and transitioned from user generated link directory to an automatically populated search-engine.

It subsequently rose from Alexa rank ~4000 to global Alexa rank 1957 before its discontinuation in 2018, of which at the time ~100 million video and download links had been indexed on alluc.

=== Discontinuation ===
On March 8, 2018, after 13 years, alluc discontinued its search engine. Sebastian Fink, the creator of the site, has stated that its discontinuation was "not driven by monetary decisions." All links on the site no longer work. As it appears on their site,

"The alluc search engine has been discontinued.

After 13 years of alluc, we decided to take a break and focus on other projects.

Over this last decade alluc served more than one billion unique users in total and we would like to thank all of you for your support over the years.

PS: Any other sites using alluc in their name are not run by us."

=== Statistics ===
2013 saw alluc jump from 6,046th to 5,027th. In July 2012, alluc was ranked (concerning traffic) 4,302nd according to Alexa Internet and is ranked in the top 1000 of sites in Ireland and United Kingdom. At the end of January 2018, alluc was ranked 1,297th worldwide.

== See also ==
- TV Links – a similar service which was shut down by the UK government
- TVCatchup
