= AliExpress =

Online retail service based in China

- Website type: Online shopping
- Owner: Alibaba Group
- Website: aliexpress.com/index.html
- Commercial: Yes
- Launched: 2010; 16 years ago
- Current status: Active

The second logo was used from 2015 to 2024

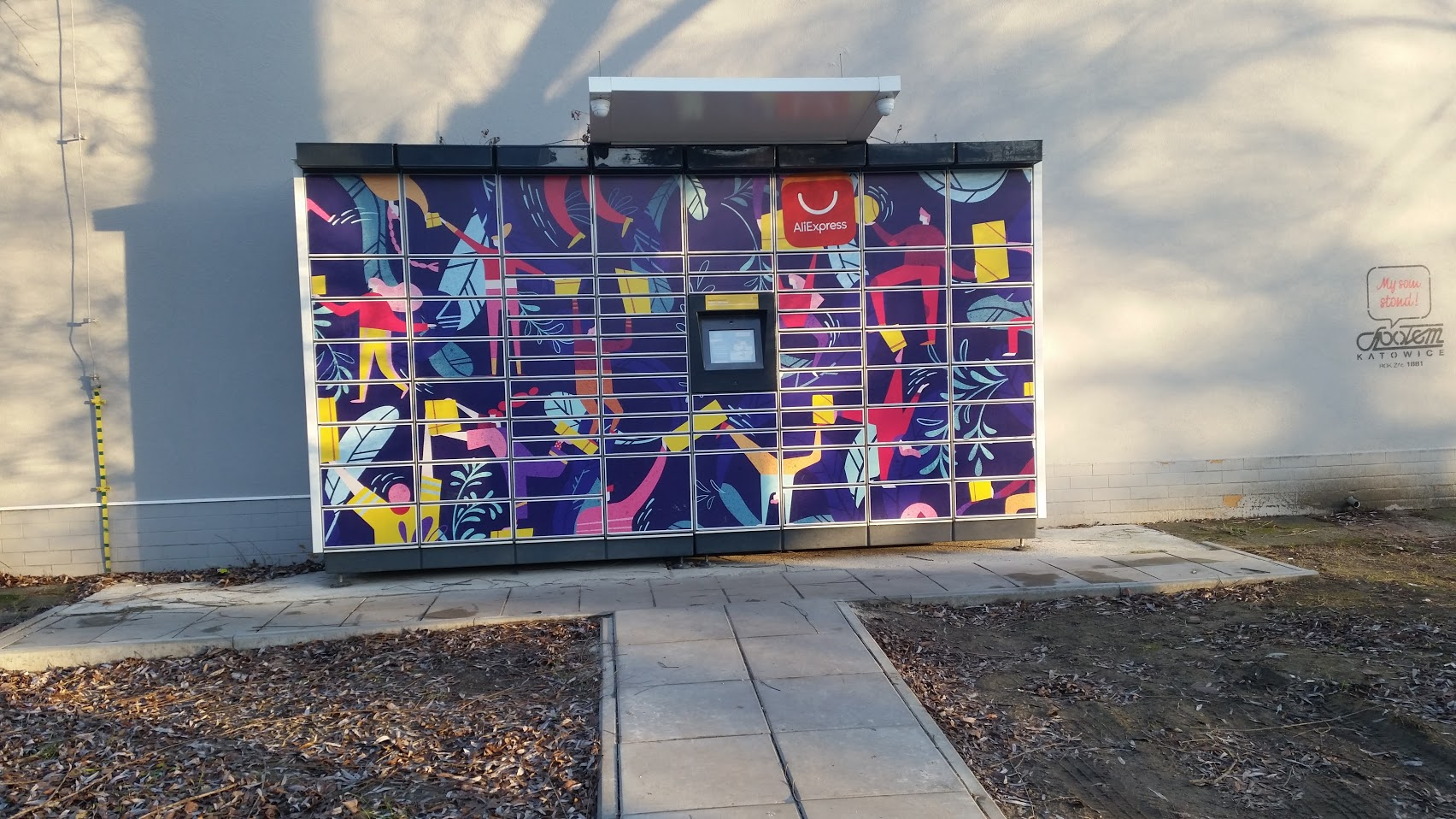
AliExpress self-service delivery station in Katowice, Poland, 2020

AliExpress (Chinese: 全球速卖通) is an online retail service based in China and owned by the Alibaba Group. Launched in 2010, it is made up of small businesses in China and other locations, such as Singapore, that offer products to international online buyers. It was the most visited e-commerce website in Russia and was the 10th most popular website in Brazil. It facilitates small businesses to sell to customers all over the world. AliExpress has drawn comparison to eBay, as sellers are independent and use the platform to offer products to buyers. As of March 2024, the number of global users of the AliExpress mobile app reached 8.18 million, a 130% year-on-year increase, setting the highest record since statistics began in 2016.

== Business model ==
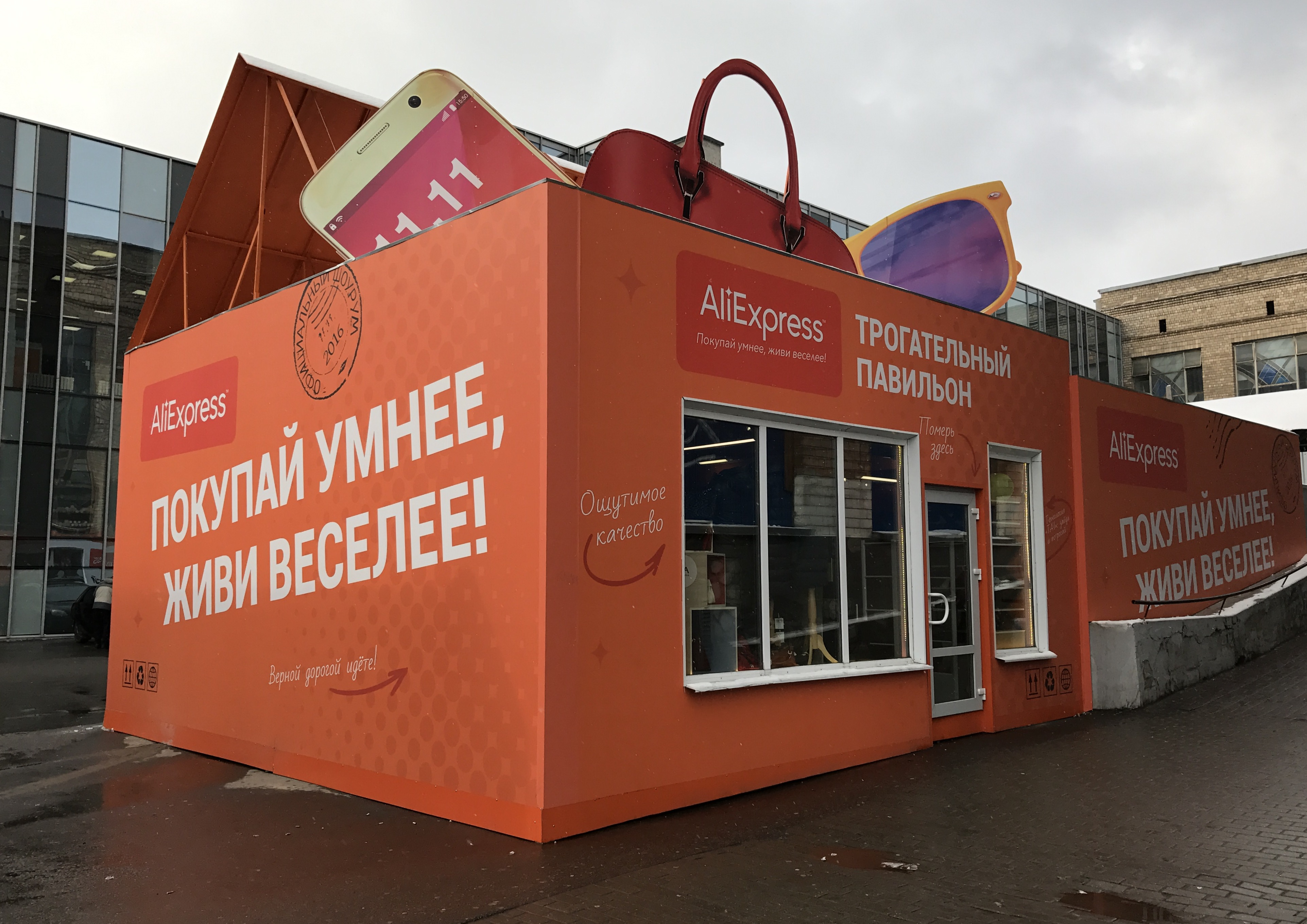
AliExpress pavilion, Moscow Leningradsky railway station, 2016

AliExpress started as a business-to-consumer buying and selling portal. Aliexpress is a subsidiary of Alibaba Group, but unlike its sister organization Alibaba.com, it is not a business to business entity but a business to customer platform that sells different products to customers worldwide where they can purchase single piece items. In 2010 the platform went live and offers electronics, clothing, home goods at wholesale pricing. It has since expanded to include business-to-consumer, consumer-to-consumer, cloud computing and payment services. As of 2016 AliExpress ran websites in English, Chinese, Spanish, Korean, Dutch, French, Italian, German, Polish, Turkish, Portuguese, Indonesian, Russian, Ukrainian, Vietnamese, Japanese, Thai and other languages - English being the default offered to those countries with languages outside the preceding list. Kuo Zhang and Jiang Fan are Alibaba executives whose roles are different but could be confused with each other because they are both associated with the company's international commerce group. Jiang Fan leads Alibaba's International Digital Commerce Group, which has a portfolio that includes consumer-facing services like AliExpress, Alibaba.com and Lazada. Kuo Zhang is the president of Alibaba.com and has different organizational responsibilities than Fan. Zhang is more concerned with the business-to-business platform that connects companies with suppliers for sourcing, including overseeing the development of AI tools like Accio Work. While Fan is more focused on customers and organizational scope, of the company as a whole. AliExpress uses Qwen large language models to create AI-based tools similar to Alibaba.com's Accio Work, but the tool has different features. The tool is called DeepInsight, and it is an AI recommendation system that pre-populates queries with context-aware suggestions.

Sellers on AliExpress can be either companies or individual industrial and commercial households. AliExpress is different from Amazon because it acts only as an e-commerce platform and does not itself sell products directly to consumers.

In 2025, United States president Donald Trump signed Executive Order 14256 to end the de minimis exemption for all products from China on 2 May. The exception had allowed low cost goods under $800 to be imported without any custom duties or tariffs. As a result of this change, there was expected disruption in the business models of retailers such as AliExpress. Some of China's biggest e-commerce companies, like Alibaba, JD, and Temu were impacted by Trump's order, which ended the de minimis exemption for Chinese goods. It came into effect on 2 May 2025, and shares for the companies fell by 5.1% for Alibaba, 6% for PDD, and 4.5% for JD. The exemption had allowed packages that were low-cost to enter the US duty-free, which allowed companies like AliExpress and Temu to grow their business because they could directly ship to US customers, who could receive duty-free Chinese products. The foundation for the new law was to counter deceptive shipping practices and crack down on synthetic opioids, but the disruptions to international e-commerce were apparent.

== Abroad ==
Since 2013, AliExpress has transitioned fully from small-scale wholesale to a To-C (consumer-oriented) platform. During this phase, the platform invested heavily in recruiting Chinese brands and focused on localized efforts in key markets such as Russia, aiming to enhance e-commerce infrastructure capabilities like logistics and payment systems. With the support of AliExpress, the delivery time of Russian postal services was reduced from several weeks to as fast as 5–7 days.

On 25 September 2024, AliExpress Korea held a conference in the Grand InterContinental Seoul Parnas, in Gangnam, South Korea, introducing various programs aimed at helping local Korean sellers to expand internationally through AliExpress, including benefits such as no fees and seller deposits for five years for Korean sellers on AliExpress.

In 2025, Cainiao, a logistics company also owned by the Alibaba Group, announced it would extend "Global 5-Day Delivery" to six additional markets—Vietnam, Singapore, the Philippines, Hungary, Austria, and Qatar—with rollout completion targeted by the end of 2025. AliExpress announced that it will offer five-day delivery for customers in the United States in 2024, as they battle with competitor Temu. AliExpress first offered international delivery to countries like Germany, France, Portugal, Saudi Arabia, and Mexico in 2023. This coincided with Temu which has also expanded into the US market. Alibaba's e-commerce site and Temu are presently two of the most valuable Chinese firms on the U.S. stock exchange. PDD, which owns Temu, overtook Alibaba's market cap in the fourth quarter of 2023 but lost the top spot to Alibaba in the first quarter, according to LSEG data.

Global 5-Day Delivery is Cainiao's logistics program that targets international delivery in roughly five days for eligible lanes, leveraging dedicated hubs, secured air capacity, and accelerated last-mile processes.

== Government responses ==
In November 2020, India's Ministry of Electronics and Information Technology banned the AliExpress mobile phone app along with 42 other Chinese apps. When AliExpress was added to the US Trade Representative's (USTR) notorious markets list in 2022, the US Trade Representative in their 2023 Review again named multiple China-based online marketplaces for substantial trademark counterfeiting and copyright piracy. In March 2024, a formal probe was opened by the European Commission over alleged sales of counterfeit and illegal products and a potential breach of the Digital Services Act. Other companies were included in a separate Information Technology and Innovation Foundation-published report that included Temu, AliExpress, and Shein as notorious markets. In the report, Alibaba was not explicitly mentioned but was only referred to as the company that owns AliExpress.

In 2022, the Office of the United States Trade Representative added AliExpress to its list of Notorious Markets for Counterfeiting and Piracy.

In November 2023, the European Commission opened a probe into AliExpress regarding "potential dissemination of illegal products such as fake medicines, non-compliant food, and ineffective dietary supplements." On the nature of the investigation, an EU official said, "We have not found yet at this stage that AliExpress is not compliant. We are simply suspecting we have elements that they are not compliant with. This is not a finding of a breach".

In July 2026, the European Commission fined AliExpress €550 million (US$629 million) under the Digital Services Act, finding that the platform had failed to adequately assess and mitigate risks involving illegal, unsafe and counterfeit products. In response, China's Ministry of Commerce stated that China opposes the EU's use of platform regulation as a pretext to erect digital barriers and adopt discriminatory measures that restrict and suppress the normal operations of Chinese e‑commerce companies in Europe. China urged the EU to stop exploiting the ambiguity of legal provisions to abuse discretionary power, and to treat Chinese enterprises fairly and impartially. AliExpress said it would appeal the penalty.
