= Chomikuj.pl =

File hosting service

chomikuj.pl
- Website type: File hosting service
- Founded: 2006
- Owner: Kelo Corporation
- Website: chomikuj.pl
- Commercial: Yes

chomikuj.pl, or Chomik(English: hamster), is a Polish file hosting service founded in 2006. As of February 2013, it was the 15th most popular website in Poland.

Any type of file can be published on the website. Unregistered users can instantly retrieve file sizes of 1 MB. After registration, a user is not subject to any limit when downloading a single file, but is limited to 50 MB transfer per week.

In 2015, it was successfully sued for copyright infringement, although it immediately appealed to the court.
