= EmuParadise =

Website that hosted video game ROMs

- Type: Private
- Industry: Gaming
- Founded: March 2000 in India
- Fate: Legal suit by Nintendo, forced to take ROM hosting offline
- Key people: MasJ (founder)
- Website: https://www.emuparadise.me/

EmuParadise is a website that hosted a large database of video game ROMs, translated games, and other gaming-related files. The website was founded in 2000 by MasJ. Emuparadise offered ROMs for a wide variety of gaming platforms, including consoles, handhelds, and arcade machines.

Emuparadise has been involved in several legal disputes over the years. Emuparadise had discontinued most of its libraries after legal action from Japanese video game company Nintendo. The website continues to host other gaming-related content, such as emulator software, game guides, and walkthroughs.

== History ==
EmuParadise was founded in 2000 by MasJ, an Indian video game enthusiast. MasJ was inspired to create the website after he had difficulty finding ROMs for old video games he wanted to play.

EmuParadise quickly became one of the most popular websites in Gaming platforms. In 2010, the website had over 10 million unique visitors per month. By 2015, that number had grown to over 20 million unique visitors per month.

In 2017, Nintendo filed lawsuits against two ROM hosting websites. Nintendo argued that the websites were infringing on its copyrights. Fearing that they may be next, in 2018, Emuparadise voluntarily shut down its ROM hosting service. However, the website continued to host other gaming-related content, such as emulator software, game guides, and walkthroughs. Emuparadise offered ROMs for a wide variety of gaming platforms, including consoles, handhelds, and arcade machines. The website also offered ROMs for translations of games, which are games that have been translated into a different language than the original language.

Accounts of more than 1 million gamers in 2019 were reportedly leaked after EmuParadise suffered a data breach, according to multiple reports. Some of those impacted by the data breach of the retro gaming site, which used to host ROMs, said that over the weekend, they started receiving notices that their accounts had been compromised in a data breach.

== Popularity ==
The website was a valuable resource for gamers who wanted to play classic video games on their computers or other devices.

Over the course of 18 years of its operation, Emuparadise went from a single-page website to a sprawling website distributed via content delivery networks around the world. At its zenith the website had an Alexa global rank of 1304 and a rank of 696 within the US.

== See also ==
- KissAnime – Anime-focused file streaming site (2012–2020)
- Limewire – Peer-to-peer file sharing application
- Media preservation – Preservation of media
- Napster – Online peer-to-peer file sharing software
- The Pirate Bay – Website providing torrent files and magnet links
- Video game preservation
- Warez scene – Organized network of pirate groups
