= RARBG =

BitTorrent metasearch engine

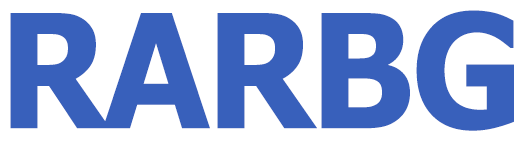

- RARBG Homepage as of July 2019
- Website type: Torrent index, magnet links provider
- Available in: English; Azerbaijani; Bengali; Bulgarian; Catalan; German; Persian; Indonesian; Hebrew
- Dissolved: May 31, 2023; 3 years ago
- Headquarters: {{{location_country}}}
- Area served: Worldwide
- Website: rarbg.to at the Wayback Machine (archived 2023-05-30)
- Registration: Closed
- Launched: 2008; 18 years ago
- Current status: Offline

RARBG was a website that provided torrent files and magnet links to facilitate peer-to-peer file sharing using the BitTorrent protocol. From 2014 to 2023, RARBG repeatedly appeared in TorrentFreak's yearly list of most visited torrent websites. It was ranked 4th as of January 2023. The website did not allow users to upload their own torrents.

== History ==
RARBG was founded in 2008. Originally conceived as a Bulgarian BitTorrent tracker (BG in the name stands for "Bulgaria"), the website had been serving an international audience since then. According to TorrentFreak, RARBG specialized in English-language "high quality video releases", but lists other content as well, including "games, software and music."

The website has been described in 2019 as a "notorious market" by the US trade representative. In 2020, the website was listed as a target of Bulgarian law enforcement.

=== Shutdown ===
On 31 May 2023, the site announced its shutdown, citing inflation, side effects of the COVID-19 pandemic and the Russian invasion of Ukraine preventing it from covering the costs to keep the site running.

== Blocking and censorship ==
RARBG was blocked in several countries around the world for legal reasons, generally due to its facilitation of copyright infringement. In December 2008, the site remained closed for one week due to legal pressure from BREIN. In 2017, RARBG was filtered out of Google search results following a controversy wherein links to torrent sites were highlighted in Google's "carousel" search results. Due to a lawsuit brought against ISP Hurricane Electric by film studios demanding the personal information of pirates, Sophidea VPN, a VPN service operated through Hurricane Electric, blocked access to several torrent sites as of December 2020, including RARBG.

Country	Date of block
Saudi Arabia	2 April 2014
United Kingdom	27 November 2014
Denmark	27 March 2015
Turkey	12 August 2015
Portugal	26 October 2015
Italy	6 March 2017
Australia	18 August 2017
Indonesia	10 October 2017
Finland	8 June 2018
Ireland	18 January 2018
Belgium	3 January 2019
India	12 April 2019
Greece	15 May 2019
Netherlands	31 March 2022
Iran	Unknown
Bulgaria	Unknown
Oman	Unknown
China	Unknown

== See also ==
- Comparison of BitTorrent sites
- Websites blocked in the United Kingdom
