= Sophidea =

Company that is located in Cheyenne, Wyoming

Sophidea Incorporated is a company that is located in Cheyenne, Wyoming. The company provides buffer against national firewalls and the company's IP addresses became the location of most of China's internet traffic, when censors briefly directed most of the nation's traffic to sites that the company owned. The registered agent for the company is Wyoming Corporate Services, which is the registered agent for 8,000 businesses. The company's former headquarters, which was once located on a residential street, was subject to a 2011 investigation by Reuters reporters detailing the company working with jailed Ukrainian Prime Minister Pavlo Lazarenko.
