= Segundamano =

- Headquarters: Spain

Segundamano is a Spanish online website and the core brand of the classifieds advertising company Grupo Anuntis-Segundamano. It is a network of local online classifieds in Spain and all Latin America, similar to Craigslist in the United States. Segundamano has some 40 years of history, from its origins as a paper weekly magazine in Spain to its current localized websites in Spain, Mexico, Colombia and Argentina.

== History ==
Segundamano was founded as a free weekly magazine of classified ads in 1978. It was acquired by the Canadian company Trader Classified Media in 1998.

In 2004, Anuntis and Segundamano merged to create the first classifieds company in the Spanish-speaking world: Grupo Anuntis-Segundamano.

The Norwegian Schibsted became main shareholder of Grupo Anuntis-Segundamano in 2006, buying 76% of the company. Schibsted also owns other classified ad websites, which are known in Spain and Latin America as InfoJobs, Coches.net, balçao.com.br or fotocasa.es.

In 2008, Grupo Anuntis-Segundamano decided to stop publishing the paper magazine Segundamano, after 30 years on newsstands, making itself a 100% online media company.

In 2013, Schibsted bought out the other shareholder Primeramá, to become the sole shareholder.

In 2015, the Spanish activities were rebranded to VIBBO. The Mexican activities continue using the Segundamano brand.
