= KissAnime =

Anime-focused file streaming site (2012–2020)

- Homepage of Kissanime.ru (August 4, 2020; 10 days before shutdown)
- Website type: File streaming
- Available in: English
- Dissolved: August 14, 2020
- Registration: Optional
- Launched: 2012
- Current status: Offline

KissAnime was an anime-focused file streaming website that hosted links and embedded videos, allowing users to stream or download movies and TV shows for free in violation of copyright laws. It was a sister site to the manga viewing website, KissManga. KissAnime was described as "one of the world's biggest streaming anime websites".

TorrentFreak reported that the sites had an audience of millions of users and that, for a time, KissAnime was "the most visited pirate site in the world".

== History ==
The site was established in 2012, and a .ru domain was later registered in 2016, becoming the primary site for KissAnime.

In mid-2017 the site was the target of a subpoena by US company Funimation Global Group, whose lawyer described KissAnime as "disseminating infringing content on a MASSIVE scale, for profit."

In December 2018, the site was blocked in Australia as part of a lawsuit filed by Roadshow Films in conjunction with 11 other media companies against 52 Australian internet service providers. The judgment in the case forced the ISPs to permanently block various websites that provided subtitled foreign media in violation of Australian copyright laws.

In July 2020 the site was similarly blocked in India along with other pirate streaming and torrent websites, after a decision by the Delhi High Court in favour of the plaintiff, Disney India. The court order provided for "dynamic" blocking meaning that Disney could ask for further bans on websites violating copyrights other than the ones in the order.

The website, along with the sister site KissManga, shut down on 14 August 2020, with some sources noting the shutdown took place only months prior to the enforcement of the new, stricter Japanese laws on online piracy.

At the time of its shutdown, KissAnime was the 515th most popular website on the internet, according to Alexa Internet.

== Reactions and response to shutdown ==
The site was criticized for copyright infringement as well as advertisements that contained malware, but it was also praised for popularizing anime and manga, and for providing access to media that was not legally available in certain regions, particularly in parts of Europe, Southeast Asia and India.

After the shutdown, one commentator noted that "fans are furious" as "Anime fans simply have nowhere to legally read and watch their favourite content." Another commentator noted "While a major strike to media piracy, the shutdown of KissAnime is a blow to the history of anime," describing how the website had served as a digital archive of rare titles, such as the 1993 original video animation, Battle Angel. Many of the works that were available on the website either had no legal digital release due to copyright complexity or expired licensing agreements, or had never been made available outside of physical media.

== See also ==
- 123Movies – Former online illegal movie streaming site network
- AniWave – File streaming website (2016–2024)
- Limewire – Peer-to-peer file sharing application
- Nyaa Torrents – File sharing website focused on East Asian media
- Online piracy – Illegal use of digital copyrighted works
- Scanlation – Fan translation of comics, often manga
- The EmuParadise – Website that hosted video game ROMs
- The Pirate Bay – Website providing torrent files and magnet links
- Warez scene – Organized network of pirate groups
