= PressPlay =

Former online music store

- 2002 logo
- Company type: Joint venture
- Industry: Digital music store
- Founded: May 2001; 24 years ago
- Defunct: May 19, 2003; 22 years ago
- Owner: Universal Music, Sony Music

PressPlay, stylised pressplay, was a digital music store that operated from December 2001 until March 2003. It was a joint venture between Universal Music Group and Sony Music Entertainment in response to the popularity of Napster and to rival RealNetworks' online service MusicNet, which had signed BMG, EMI and AOL Time Warner. The service was unpopular and widely derided.

== History ==
The service was announced in April 2001 as Duet. Yahoo announced a deal to market the service.

The service was rebranded as pressplay in June 2001.

In August 2001, the United States Department of Justice began an antitrust investigation of both pressplay and MusicNet, before the services launched.

The service launched in December 2001. That month, it announced an agreement with Roxio to offer users the ability to burn CDs.

It announced a licensing agreement with Broadcast Music, Inc. in January 2002.

In May 2003, Roxio acquired the service for $12.5 million in cash and approximately 3.9 million shares of Roxio common stock and used it as a base to launch a music streaming service under the brand name Napster.

== Reception ==
The service was not attractive to either artists or consumers. PressPlay and rival MusicNet were given the shared 9th place on the 2006 list of the "25 Worst Tech Products of All Time" by PC World, which stated that "the services' stunningly brain-dead features showed that the record companies still didn't get it".

The service had many restrictions: on a monthly basis, users were allowed 500 low-quality audio streams in DRM Windows Media Audio, 50 song downloads, and 10 songs burnt to CD. Not every song could be downloaded, and users could not burn more than two tracks from the same artist to CD. Downloads expired after 30 days. Songs could not be transferred to a portable player.

Artists were paid around $0.0023 (0.23 of a cent) per song, which led many artists to request that their music be removed from the service.

== In popular media ==
The disastrous history of Pressplay was detailed in How Music Got Free by Stephen Witt, published in 2015.
