= Mp3skull =

MP3 file sharing website

MP3Skull
- Available in: English
- Area served: Worldwide
- Users: Over one million per day as of March 2015
- Launched: 2010; 16 years ago
- Current status: Offline
- Written in: HTML, JavaScript and PHP

MP3Skull was a search engine that provided direct download links to MP3 files located on third-party sites. It was founded in 2010 and the site has been the subject of controversy for helping users to find unauthorized copies of copyrighted music.

Although MP3Skull was among Alexa's Top 500 websites in 2013, it suffered a drop in ranking due to a Google algorithm update that impacted sites considered to be promoting piracy. In 2016, the RIAA, representing major record labels, won a default judgment against MP3Skull in a copyright infringement lawsuit, resulting in a $22.2 million damages award and the seizure of several associated domains. As of October 2016, the website is offline.

== Blocking and censorship ==
MP3Skull claimed to comply with the DMCA and remove infringing content reported by content owners. On 17 April 2015, a lawsuit was filed against the operators of the website. The music companies involved in the suit asked for $520 million in statutory damages and a permanent injunction that prevents domain registrars and registries from working with the site.

It has been speculated that the lawsuit was filed as a way for the record labels to backdoor SOPA and use it further as a precedent to take other domains and websites down. Similar lawsuits against Hotfile and IsoHunt ended with both sites being shut down and settlements of $80 million and $110 million respectively.

In October 2015, the website was submitted to USTR as a notorious pirate site by RIAA. According to RIAA, MP3Skull was the most highly trafficked MP3 website of its kind in the world as of 2015. As of February 9, 2016, RIAA had requested a total of 1,769,414 URLs on mp3skull.com to be removed from Google's search results. RIAA has mentioned the website specifically in their blog as well as in a public forum by CEO Cary Sherman.

The site's domain name was changed from mp3skull.com to mp3skull.to early in 2015, and operated via different domains ever since then. On 24 February 2016 group of prominent RIAA labels have won a default judgment against the site in a lawsuit started on 17 April 2015. Listing 148 music tracks as evidence, the companies asked for the maximum $950,000 in statutory damages for each, bringing the total to more than $190 million. This award was granted by U.S. District Judge Marcia G. Cooke, who additionally issued a permanent injunction preventing the site's operators from engaging in copyright-infringing activity in the future. The site is consequently now offline.

== See also ==
- Trade group efforts against file sharing
