= Cuevana =

Argentine file-sharing website

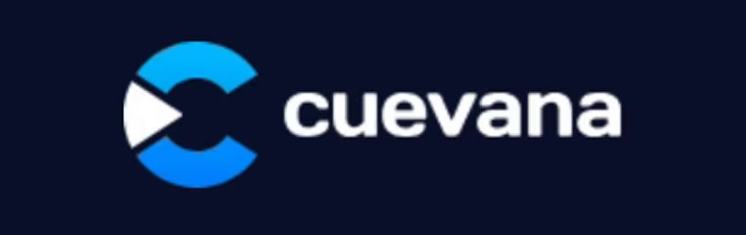
- Website type: Movies and television streaming
- Available in: Spanish; English
- Creators: Mario Cardosio; David Fernández; Tomás Escobar
- Commercial: Free access
- Launched: October 1, 2009; 16 years ago
- Current status: Discontinued

Cuevana was an Argentine file sharing website that offers movies and television content in their original languages, with Spanish subtitles. The site was created in October 2009 and as of 2011 was one of the 20 most visited websites in Argentina with half a million visits daily.

Cuevana operates as a connecting hub that uses plugins to allow users to stream content. Cuevana claims not to store files itself, but makes it easy to reach content by linking to external online storage. This method of operation has created a strong debate on the matter of the legality of the operation.

On August 14, 2012, a download option was created, called DCuevana.

As of 2014, cuevana.tv distributed the software Cuevana Storm which, like Popcorn Time, operates as a torrent client that lets downloaders immediately watch a movie while simultaneously uploading it to others.

The website was placed on the US notorious markets list in 2021. As of 2022, it is reportedly operated from Venezuela.

== Legal instances ==
- November 22, 2011, HBO Latin America initiated a criminal case against Cuevana and one of its founders Tomas Escobar for alleged violation of Argentine law 11,723 (intellectual property). The judge in the case has decided not to block access to Cuevana.
- November 29, 2011, Turner Argentina obtained an injunction from the Federal Court of First Instance ordered block any user access to the portal Cuevana for the series Falling Skies, BRIC and 26 people to save the world. The measure requires companies that provide Internet web links block that provides the gateway to such series under penalty to impose a fine of 1000 pesos daily.
- December 2, 2011, the Internet Service Provider (ISP) Telecentro SA de Argentina would have completely blocked the entry of customers to the site Cuevana invoking the precautionary measure, the total blockade would not have lasted more than 24 hours.
- In May 2014, German users of Cuevana Storm received demands for damages of 815 Euros from a law firm. Some users thought they were streaming the content rather than distributing it.
