= MVGroup =

BitTorrent tracker and file sharing community

- Website type: Torrent index
- Owner: Unknown
- Creators: Merrin (deceased), DarkRain
- Revenue: Self-funded / donations
- Website: forums.mvgroup.org
- Registration: Free
- Launched: 2002

MVGroup is a BitTorrent tracker and file sharing forum community that specializes in the distribution of educational media, especially documentaries. MVGroup was established in 2002 by "Merrin" and "DarkRain" (Vittorio in those days, hence MVGroup) as a DVD-ripping-and-distributing group for the eDonkey file-sharing network, and the group continues to distribute DVD rips and TV rips on both eDonkey and BitTorrent. It has continued to function since its establishment, except for a short-lived April 2008 outage caused by an error from an anti-piracy group.

On May 5, 2008, "Merrin", the co-founder of the tracker died of undisclosed long-term health problems at the age of 31. By the time of his death, MVGroup had gained over 150,000 members, and has continued to set itself apart from larger trackers, such as The Pirate Bay, by focusing on documentaries and educational material only.

== See also ==
- Comparison of BitTorrent sites
