= YourBittorrent =

BitTorrent metasearch engine

- YourBittorrent Homepage as of June 2019
- Website type: BitTorrent Search Engine
- Available in: English
- Owner: Undisclosed
- Creator: Undisclosed
- Website: yourbittorrent.com
- Commercial: No
- Registration: Open
- Launched: January 2003
- Current status: Online

YourBittorrent is a file sharing website founded as myBittorrent in 2003; the new site, yourBittorrent, is the result of a split in ownership in 2009. The site is a torrent tracking website for the P2P BitTorrent network. As such it does not host files, but hosts information about the location of these files in an indexed torrent file. These torrent files are read by a client located on an individual's computer.

YourBittorrent uses automated software to search the Internet for host file information and does not actively oversee what is indexed in its database. With a lack of oversight, the site hosts some torrents which allow users to access software, movies, music and other items under which are under copyright and thus illegal to distribute publicly, though the files themselves remain on other servers. Illegal trackers are removed by the site when a request is made by a legitimate party.

== Kidnap ==
myBittorrent (currently known as YourBittorrent) was the first BitTorrent site that has ever been "kidnapped" by its registrar. The website went down on 10 January 2006 for alleged violation of the registrar's abuse policy. myBittorrent was given two options in an email sent by GoDaddy, neither of which included an appeal process. The myBittorrent administration sent several emails trying to resolve the issue, but GoDaddy refused to respond until the myBittorrent administration told GoDaddy that they were going to take legal measures. Not long after that email was sent, GoDaddy fully restored the suspended account.

== Microsoft takedown notice on open source torrents ==
In 2006, Microsoft sent a takedown notice to site, complaining about multiple files, including a “Windows-to-Linux-Migration” video, a Xandros Linux torrent, and a NeoOffice 1.2 distribution (an OpenOffice.org fork for Mac OS X).

== Transition to yourBittorrent ==
On 22 March 2009, the owners of myBittorrent had a disagreement over the website's future. The ongoing juridical procedures against other torrent sites like The Pirate Bay made one of the owners want to downsize the website and over time stop running it. On the other side, the other co-owner wanted it to become bigger and possibly merge with other torrent sites. They decided that they would each go their own way. One owner would keep myBittorrent.com and after a transition period close it down, while the other owner would move all the torrents to yourBittorrent.com. Between March 2009 and July 2009 the owners of myBittorrent held a transition period. On 9 July 2009, the domain myBittorrent.com was shut down after most of the traffic had moved onto yourBittorrent.com already.

== See also ==
- Comparison of BitTorrent sites
