= 4shared =

File-sharing platform

- Screenshot
- Website type: File hosting
- Available in: English, German, Russian, Korean, Indonesian, Malay, Portuguese (Brazil), Italian, French, Spanish, Chinese, Arabic, Vietnamese, Thai, Japanese, Persian, Polish, Turkish
- Founded: 2005
- Headquarters: Kyiv, Ukraine
- Website: www.4shared.com/aboutus.jsp
- Commercial: Yes
- Launched: 2005
- Native clients on: Windows; macOS; Linux; iOS; Android

4shared, also known as 4shared.com, is a file-sharing website.

== Features ==
4shared supports the WebDAV, FTP, and SFTP protocols, in addition to having a web interface. 4shared is a freemium service, with significant usage limitations on non-paying users, such as a daily bandwidth limit of 3 GB.

== History ==
In 2011, 4shared was ranked the largest file-sharing website, beating out others such as Megaupload and MediaFire.

The site was labelled as a notorious market in 2016: "While 4shared provides legitimate file-storage services, the site also facilitates the streaming and downloading of high volumes of allegedly pirated videos, music, books, and video games."

In 2019, 4shared's Android app was discovered to be serving invisible advertisements to users, and automatically signing them up for unwanted services. The app was replaced with a non-malicious version on April of the same year, after being removed on Google Play.

== See also ==
- Megaupload
- Openload
