= 123Movies =

Former online illegal movie streaming site network

123Movies / GoMovies
- Website type: Online file hosting index
- Available in: English
- Country of origin: Vietnam
- Area served: Worldwide
- Editor: (Vietnamese-based)
- Revenue: Advertising
- Commercial: Yes
- Registration: Optional
- Users: 98 million at peak
- Launched: est. 2015–2016 (Note: The MPAA only first makes comment on 123Movies in its 2016 report to the USTR; it does not appear in the MPAA 2015 report to the USTR on Notorious Markets. Similarly, the earliest article on TorrentFreak regarding 123Movies dates from late 2016.)
- Current status: Offline
- Content license: Unlicensed

123Movies, GoMovies, GoStream, MeMovies or 123movieshub was a network of file streaming websites operating from Vietnam which allowed users to watch films for free. It was called the world's "most popular illegal site" by the Motion Picture Association of America (MPAA) in March 2018, before being shut down a few weeks later on foot of a criminal investigation by the Vietnamese authorities.

== Development ==
GoMovies logo

The site went through several name changes after being shut down from different domains; sometimes the name appeared as "123Movies", and other times as "123movies". The original name, and URL, was 123movies.to, which changed to other domains including 123movies.is before redirecting to gomovies.to and later gomovies.is. It was changed to gostream.is, and then to memovies.to, before changing to 123movieshub.to/is and remaining there until shutdown.

In October 2016, the MPAA listed 123Movies in its Online Notorious Markets overview to the Office of the United States Trade Representative (USTR), stating that: "The site has a global Alexa rank of 559 and a local rank of 386 in the U.S. 123movies.to had 9.26 million worldwide unique visitors in August 2016 according to SimilarWeb data". In October 2016, Business Insider reported that 123movies.to was the "most-used pirate website" in the United Kingdom.

123Movies included HD, HD-RIP, Blu-ray and camera qualities of films. The video hosters and players it used included Openload, Streamango, and MyCloud. During its existence and shutdown period, the site was covered by TorrentFreak regarding its features, uptime/downtime, shutdown, and reasons for shutdown.

In December 2017, the creators of 123movies launched another streaming site dedicated to anime, named AnimeHub.to, which remained online for months after 123Movies's shutdown.

== Shutdown ==
In March 2017, TorrentFreak reported that the US ambassador to Vietnam, Ted Osius, had been in talks with the local Minister of Information and Communications, Truong Minh Tuan, about shutting down illegal video streaming sites operating from Vietnam, and listed 123movies as one specific site.

In October 2017, the MPAA listed 123Movies (and GoStream.is) in its Online Notorious Markets overview to the Office of the United States Trade Representative, stating that while the site was technically hosted from Ukraine that: "The site takes numerous steps to hide the identity of the operator, including using Cloudflare, but there is strong reason to believe the operator is still in Vietnam; content is uploaded using cyberlockers from numerous email accounts originating from Can Tho University of Medicine and Pharmacy".

In March 2018, the MPAA said that the site was the "most popular illegal site in the world", stated it was operated from Vietnam and estimated that it received 98 million visitors per month. On 19 March 2018, a note on the site's home page announced its shutdown, and urged users to "respect filmmakers by paying for movies and TV-shows".

== Reappearance ==
In October 2018, the MPAA's update on Online Notorious Markets to the United States Trade Representative, said that the closure of 123movies, 123movieshub, gostream, and gomovies, on foot of a criminal investigation in Vietnam in 2018, was "an important development" in combatting illegal film piracy services. However, the MPAA report also noted that numerous copycat sites had emerged in at least eight other countries. In November 2018 TorrentFreak reported sites connected or similar to 123Movies such as WatchAsap had also been shut down by the FBI, but were re-directing to other file sharing sites. Clones of 123Movies were also available in India despite authorities having blocked the main website.

== See also ==
- FMovies
- List of websites blocked in the United Kingdom
- Putlocker, similar online movie streaming network
- YIFY Torrents (or YTS), online movie file downloading network
- Popcorn Time, a freeware program allowing users to watch movies through torrenting on several platforms.
