= FMovies =

Series of file-streaming websites

- Website type: Streaming media
- Available in: Multilingual
- Dissolved: August 2024
- Area served: Worldwide (blocked in Australia; United Arab Emirates, Sweden, and the United Kingdom)
- Advertising: Yes; pop-up advertising
- Commercial: Yes
- Registration: Optional
- Launched: 2016; 10 years ago
- Current status: Defunct
- Written in: HTML, JavaScript and PHP

FMovies is a series of file streaming websites that hosted links and embedded videos, allowing users to stream or download movies for free. The sites had been subject to legal action in various jurisdictions on grounds of copyright infringement and piracy. In August 2024, the Alliance for Creativity and Entertainment announced that the site was shut down by Vietnamese authorities. The site was receiving billions of views a year at its peak.

== History ==
The site was created in 2016, (Note: fmovies.to registered 23 November 2016) and blocked from Google searches in December 2016.

In November 2017, FMovies lost a lawsuit brought by Filipino media and entertainment group ABS-CBN, and was ordered to pay $210,000.

In January 2018, the site was identified as a "notorious market" by the U.S. government, along with The Pirate Bay and other piracy sites. In October 2018, Telia Company, a Swedish Internet service provider (ISP), was ordered to block FMovies. They appealed the order. That same month, the Motion Picture Association reported FMovies along with other piracy sites to the U.S. government. FMovies was blocked in Australia in December 2018, after a request in August.

In February 2019, Sweden asked advertisers to blacklist some piracy and streaming sites, which included FMovies. In April 2019, ISPs in India were ordered to block FMovies and other piracy sites.

In October 2023, Vietnam's Ministry of Information and Communications declared a joint operation with the Ministry of Culture, Sports and Tourism and Ministry of Public Security divisions, with direct focus on FMovies in an effort to combat piracy.

In December 2023, scrutiny heightened as the United States House Judiciary Subcommittee on Courts, the Internet, and Intellectual Property held a livestreamed hearing with the Motion Picture Association, where calls for more action against FMovies were requested, with Karyn Temple calling for ISPs within the United States to block access to the website entirely, also citing other concerns regarding how the website may garner revenue.

In July 2024 the site was reported as offline. Several websites related to FMovies have followed suit next month. In August 2024, the Alliance for Creativity and Entertainment announced that the site was shut down by Vietnamese authorities, with Hanoi police having arrested two Vietnamese men in relation to the website. TorrentFreak reported that according to local police, the suspects allegedly earned “hundreds of thousands of US dollars” while operating the site, and "both men confessed in full to all alleged crimes."

== See also ==
- Putlocker, similar online movie streaming network
- YIFY Torrents (or YTS), online movie file downloading network
- Popcorn Time, a freeware program allowing users to watch movies through torrenting on several platforms
- 123Movies, similar online movie streaming network
