= 1337x =

File-sharing website

- 1337x homepage as of July 2019
- Website type: Torrent index, magnet links provider
- Area served: Worldwide
- Website: 1337x.to
- Registration: Optional
- Launched: 2007; 19 years ago
- Current status: Online
- Written in: HTML, JavaScript, and PHP

1337x (read as "Leet X") is a website that provides a directory of torrent files and magnet links used for peer-to-peer file sharing through the BitTorrent protocol. It is primarily used to facilitate online piracy.

According to the TorrentFreak news blog, 1337x is the second-most popular torrent website as of 2025. The site and its variants have been blocked in a variety of nations, including Australia and Portugal; at least 6.59 million takedown requests targeting the domain 1337x.to have been sent to Google.

1337x has been touted as a more strictly-moderated alternative to The Pirate Bay.

== History ==
1337x was founded in 2007 and saw increasing popularity in 2016 after the closure of KickassTorrents. In October 2016, it introduced a website redesign with added functionality.

In 2015, the site was blacklisted from Google Search; this action was taken following a DMCA complaint by Feelgood Entertainment. Later that year, the site moved from its older .pl domain to .to, partly in order to evade the block.

Early in 2024, the U.S. Trade Representative flagged it as "one of the most notorious pirate sites".

In late September 2026, 1337x experienced an outage after Russian missile strikes hit data center infrastructure in Kyiv, Ukraine. Operators confirmed servers went offline due to physical damage to hosting facilities, which also affected regional provider NordicQuality. Service recovered shortly after as traffic was rerouted to backup nodes outside the conflict zone.

== See also ==
- Comparison of BitTorrent sites
- Leech or leecher – A user who downloads data in torrenting and peer-to-peer networks
