= Alliance for Creativity and Entertainment =

Global content coalition

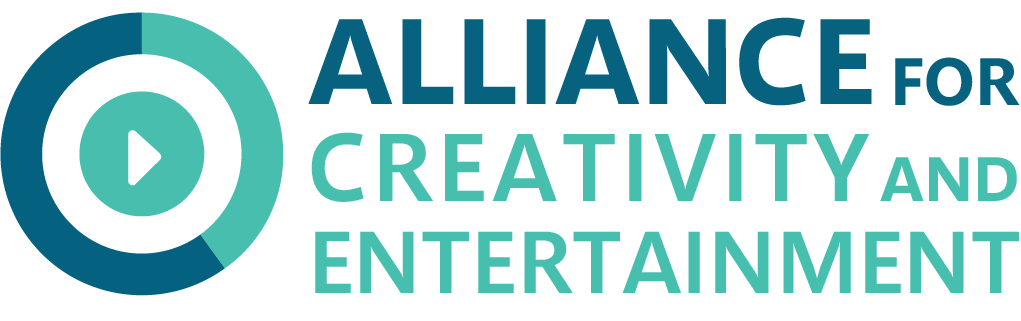
- Abbreviation: ACE
- Formation: June 13, 2017; 9 years ago
- Region served: Worldwide
- Website: alliance4creativity.com

Alliance for Creativity and Entertainment (ACE) is a coalition of the world's leading studios, broadcasters, sports associations and entertainment networks, aimed at reducing online piracy of copyrighted material. ACE was launched on June 13, 2017.

The mission of ACE is to detect, deter, and dismantle piracy, drawing on the anti-piracy resources of the Motion Picture Association (MPA). The organization conducts research into online pirating, lobby law enforcement to stop and sue pirate enterprises, file civil litigations, and to pursue voluntary agreements with responsible parties across the internet ecosystem — such as search engines and broadband providers.

On October 31, 2019, they shut down the streaming providers Openload and Streamango. In December 2020, ACE shut down pirate IPTV service Beast IPTV. In May 2021, ACE shut down and seized the domain of popular streaming site 123movies.la. In July 2023, ACE shut down anime pirate site Zoro.to. In August 2024, ACE shut down FMovies, the largest piracy site in the world at the time. ACE shut down pirate sports streaming site Streameast in September 2025, as well as TVpass.org in June 2026.

The organization promotes itself as marking a new level of coordination among multiple stakeholders.

== Members ==
As of October 2025, the members of the Alliance for Creativity and Entertainment are:

- Amazon
  - Metro-Goldwyn-Mayer
- Apple TV+
- BBC Studios
- BeIN Media Group
- Bell Media
- Canal+ S.A.
- Cavea Plus
- Channel 5
- Chilevisión
- Comcast
  - NBCUniversal
  - Sky
  - Telemundo
- Constantin Film
- DAZN Group
  - Foxtel
- Fox
- France Télévisions
- GMA Network
- Grupo Globo
- MBC Group
- Megacable
- Millicom
- Netflix
- OSN
- Paramount Skydance
  - Paramount Pictures
  - TIS Productions
- RTL Deutschland
- SF Studios
- SimpleTV
- Sony Pictures
- The Star (Malaysia)
- Studio Babelsberg
- STX Entertainment
- Grupo Televisa
- TelevisaUnivision
  - Univision
- TrueVisions
- United Group
- Village Roadshow
- ViuTV
- The Walt Disney Company
  - Hulu
- Warner Bros. Discovery
  - HBO
  - Ole Distribution

== See also ==
- Content Overseas Distribution Association, a similar Japanese anti-piracy group for anime and manga series
