= Openload =

File-sharing website

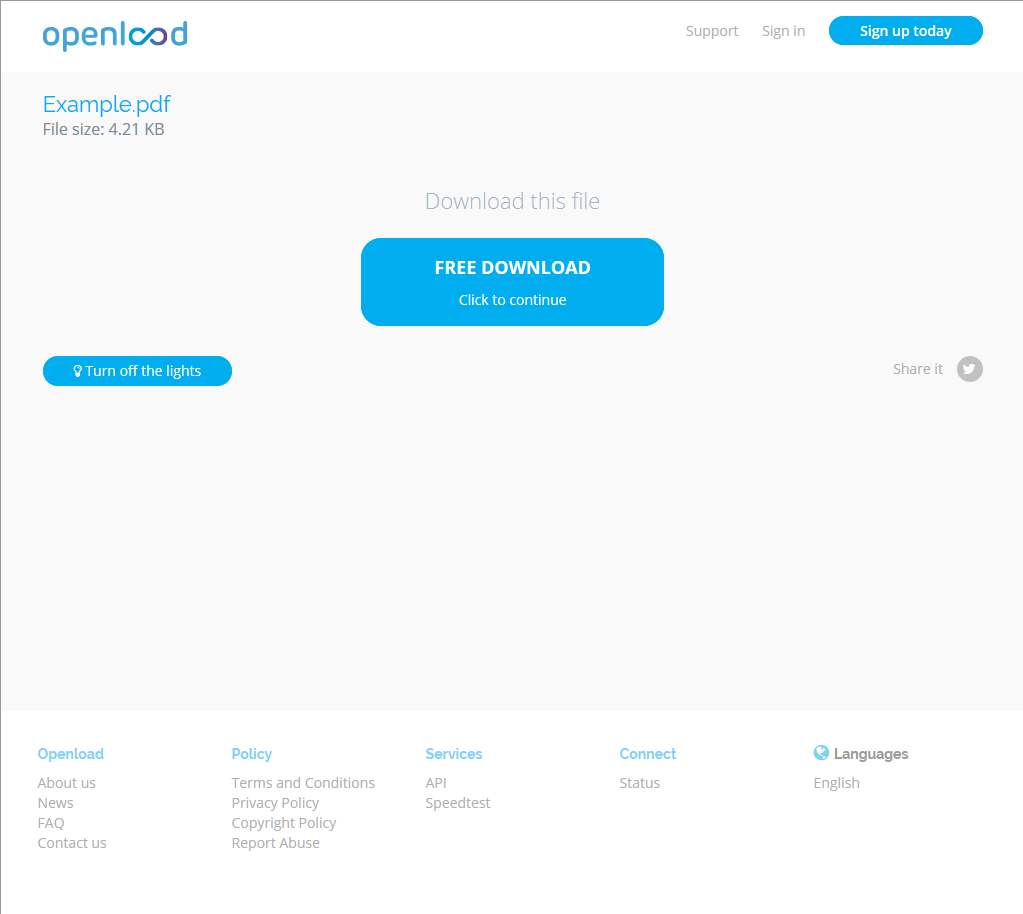
- Screenshot
- Website type: File-sharing
- Dissolved: October 31, 2019
- Website: openload.co
- Launched: October 2015; 11 years ago
- Current status: Shut down

Openload was a file-sharing website that shut down in 2019 after legal action by the Alliance for Creativity and Entertainment. The site was highly-used before its shutdown, making most of its money from advertising and cryptojacking. The site was designated as a notorious market and often used for copyright infringement.

== History ==
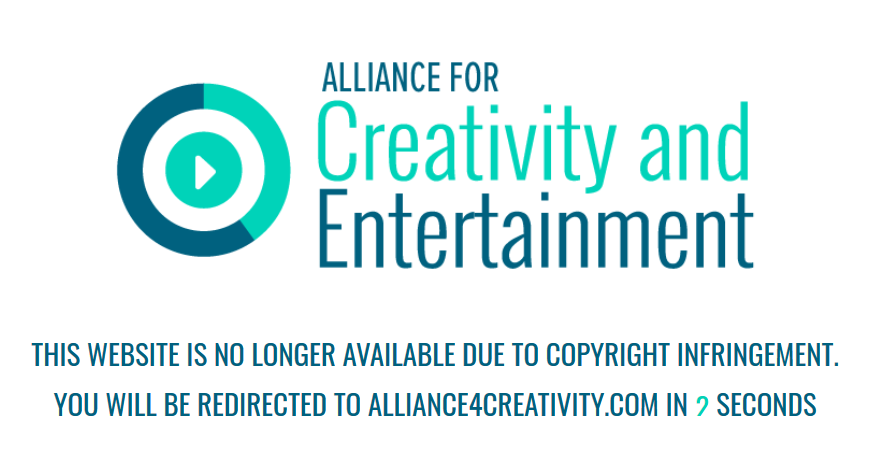
Message that appears on openload.co after the takedown

Openload was available as an open alpha in July 2015, and fully launched as of October 2015.

In 2016, Openload's domain was suspended by Namecheap due to the large number of DMCA reports they generated. The domain was later reinstated by Namecheap.

In 2017, Openload was criticized for using their users' browsers to mine the cryptocurrency Monero, using code similar to Coinhive. Openload earned an estimated $95,000 per month from the mining, while their suspected subsidiary Streamango earned an estimated $7,200 per month.

In 2018, Openload was listed as a notorious market. Openload accounted for more network usage than services such as Hulu.

In February 2019, Reddit was found to be shadowbanning links to Openload. In April 2019, Openload stopped paying uploaders as part of its affiliate program. In June 2019, Openload's main domain name, openload.co, was suspended.

In October 2019, Openload agreed to shut down after the Alliance for Creativity and Entertainment (ACE) took legal action against them in Germany. ACE then acquired all of Openload's domains, which now redirect to a page stating that the site is no longer available due to copyright infringement, along with a warning against subscribing or using illegal streaming services. After a ten second countdown, the page redirects to a page on ACE's website on watching content legally.

== Streamango ==
Streamango was a similar streaming website, long believed to be operated by Openload. Streamango shut down at the same time as Openload, with the same reasons given. Streamango domains also redirect to ACE's website.

== See also ==
- Megaupload
- 4shared
