= Putlocker =

Online illegal movie streaming site network

- Screenshot of Putlocker's homepage, 2016
- Website type: File hosting index (or cyberlocker)
- Available in: English
- Country of origin: United Kingdom; United States
- Revenue: Advertisements
- Registration: None
- Current status: Offline (clones and copy sites available)

Putlocker is a file hosting index website used for streaming entertainment media, particularly films and television series, for free. The initial website originated in the United Kingdom in 2011, and grew to receive millions of daily visitors after the shutdown of Megaupload. In May 2016, the website was blocked in the UK by a High Court order, and at its peak prior to a temporary closure in late 2016, Alexa Internet listed Putlocker as ranking among the top 250 most-visited websites worldwide. Putlocker has been reported by the Motion Picture Association (MPA) as a major piracy threat.

Putlocker's domain address has changed multiple times throughout its history, with a number of URLs bearing the Putlocker name being suspended or seized. It is not publicly known whether an official Putlocker website maintained by the original team remains available online, but at least fifty mirror or proxy websites, many of which use the Putlocker name, have been identified.

== History ==
=== Launch and popularity ===
Putlocker originated in the United Kingdom under the URL putlocker.com. In early January 2012, the website received about 800,000 visitors a day, but after the website Megaupload was shut down due to copyright infringement, Putlocker began receiving approximately 1.6 million visitors a day. The website's operations officer, Adrian Petroff, found Megaupload's closure worrying, stating "who needs SOPA when a studio exec can make a wish/hit list and sites 'voluntarily' shut down?"

In March 2012, Putlocker was identified by Alfred Perry, vice president for worldwide content protection at Paramount Pictures, as one of the "top 5 rogue cyberlocker services". The website's URL was changed to putlocker.bz, an address which was seized by the Police Intellectual Property Crime Unit of the UK in June 2014, and was subsequently changed to putlocker.is, a domain located in Iceland. In India, Putlocker and its clones have been blocked since the website first gained prominence in 2011, this followed from a court injunction in a case filed by Reliance BIG Pictures, ordering the blocking of file sharing websites which hosted copyrighted content.

In 2014, "Putlocker" was reported as being one of the top trending search queries on Google Search in Canada for that year.

=== 2016–present ===
From around early October 2016, the putlocker.is address displayed an error stating that the website's host service was inaccessible. Around this time, the Motion Picture Association (MPA) reported Putlocker to the Office of the United States Trade Representative as a piracy threat. The MPA revealed that Putlocker operated from Vietnam, and that its servers were hosted by the Swiss company Private Layer.

Prior to its closure, putlocker.is was listed among the top 250 websites globally and the top 150 in the United States, according to Alexa data. A mirror site under the address putlocker.today appeared shortly after the assumed termination of putlocker.is, and on 17 October 2016, an address under the name putlocker9.com was reported to be available.

On 2 November 2016, the putlocker.is address became active again, redirecting its users to the updated URL putlockers.ch. On 27 February 2017, the putlockers.ch address was suspended after a ruling by a Tribunal d'arrondissement of Luxembourg in favour of the Belgian Entertainment Association, and the domain ownership transferred to EuroDNS. The chief legal officer of EuroDNS, Luc Seufer, stated that EuroDNS is required to "prevent any 'reactivation' of this domain name [putlockers.ch] until its expiration date". Following the seizure of the putlockers.ch address, the previously used putlocker.is domain was made functional again.

In March 2017, it was reported that Ted Osius, then United States Ambassador to Vietnam, had held a meeting with Truong Minh Tuan, Vietnam's Minister of Information and Communications, during which Osius urged for the criminal prosecution of Putlocker, along with the websites 123Movies and KissCartoon, for copyright infringement.

Not long afterwards, putlocker.is, which changed to putlockertv.is and subsequently putlockers.cc, was reportedly redirecting visitors to a scamming site. In May 2017, at least three working sites bearing the Putlocker name were known to be available: putlocker.rs, with a Serbian top-level domain (TLD), putlockertv.ist, with an Istanbulite TLD, and putlockerhd.is, with an Icelandic TLD.

In July 2017, the International Business Times reported that "15% of internet users in the UK are either infringing copyright through streaming or illegal downloads, with pirated TV material primarily accessed through Kodi (16%) or Putlocker (17%)". In August 2017, Justice John Nicholas of the Federal Court of Australia ordered Australian internet service providers to block access to 42 piracy sites in a case brought by Village Roadshow, with Putlocker, KissCartoon, and GoMovies being among those ordered to be blocked.

In June 2018, Trevon Maurice Franklin of Fresno, California pleaded guilty to violating federal copyright law back in February 2016, when he downloaded the superhero film Deadpool from Putlocker and then uploaded it to Facebook eight days after the film was released theatrically in the United States. As a result, the film was viewed over 6 million times for free, with the total retail value of the copies being estimated at around $2,500. In October 2018, Franklin was sentenced to 24 days in federal detention for a Class A Misdemeanor followed by a year of supervised release, including 20 hours of community service per week.

== See also ==
- List of websites blocked in the United Kingdom
- 123Movies, a similar online movie streaming network
- PeerTube, a peer-to-peer video platform
- Popcorn Time, a free software program allowing users to watch movies through torrenting on several platforms.
- YIFY Torrents (or YTS Torrents), an online movie file downloading network
