= Web blocking in the United Kingdom =

The precise number of websites blocked in the United Kingdom is unknown. Blocking techniques vary from one Internet service provider (ISP) to another with some sites or specific URLs blocked by some ISPs and not others. Websites and services are blocked using a combination of data feeds from private content-control technology companies, government agencies, NGOs, court orders in conjunction with the service administrators who may or may not have the power to unblock, additionally block, appeal or recategorise blocked content.

== Overview ==
There are a number of different web blocking programmes in the UK. The high-profile default ISP filters and IWF filters have been referred to as a "pornwall", "porn filter", "Hadrian's Firewall", "Great Firewall of Britain" and the "Great Firewall of Cameron". However the programmes are usually referred to interchangeable or individually rather than collectively.

Programme	Content	Organisation	Implementation	Coverage
Active
Child porn and obscene content blocking	Child Pornography & Criminally obscene adult content	Internet Watch Foundation	ISP implementation of child abuse image content list	98.6% as of 2009
Copyright infringement site blocking	Copyright infringing sites subject to court orders	Rights holder organisations court orders	ISP implementation of secret court orders	
Default ISP Filters	Varied, see ISP Default network blocking category comparison	Broadband ISPs with varied technology partners	ISP Content-control software See Technologies	93% of new consumer connections since January 2014; Unknown percent of active connections
Mobile Internet Filtering	Varied, see Mobile Internet Blocking	Mobile network operator with varied technology partners within the British Board of Film Classification framework	ISP Content-control software	100% of new contracts since 2004; Unknown percent of active connections
Wifi Hotspot Filtering	Varied, see Public Wi-Fi	Arqiva, BT, Sky, Nomad Digital, Virgin, O2	ISP Content-control software	90% of public Wi-Fi as of 2013
Wifi Hotspot Filtering	Varied, see Public Wi-Fi	Private Hotspot Providers	ISP Content-control software	49% of wifi hotspots as of 2013
Library and educational filtering	Varied including Payday loans, see Libraries and educational institutions	Local government	Content-control software	Majority of Schools; Many Libraries
Corporate network filtering	Often social media, may extend to wider content	Company IT Department	Content-control software often with SSL deep packet inspection	Unknown
Technical threat blocking	Malware, Phishing, Spyware etc.	ISPs with technology partners	Blacklisting	Optional, usage unknown
Planned
Extremist material blocking	Extremism and Terrorism	Counter Terrorism Internet Referral Unit	URL Blocking List	Currently Public Estate Blocking Only
Proposed
Government White List	Websites incorrectly filtered	UK Council for Child Internet Safety	TBA	Not in effect
Social Media and Communications blocking	Social Media, BlackBerry Messenger	-	Unknown	Proposed for emergencies
Network-capable device level mandated filtering	Pornography	-	Device manufacturers	Proposed

Inciting racial hatred was removed from the IWF's remit on the setting up of a police website for the purpose in April 2011.

The technical measures used to block sites include DNS hijacking, DNS blocking, IP address blocking, and Deep packet inspection, making consistent verification problematic. One known method is ISP scraping DNS of domains subject to blocking orders to produce a list of IPs to block.

The Open Rights Group has proposed adding the new HTTP status code '451' to help streamline and add transparency to the process of determining when a site is blocked.

== Active programmes ==
=== Copyright ===
==== Court-ordered blocks ====
It is an established procedure in the UK for rights-holders to use 'Section 97' court orders to require ISPs to block copyright-infringing sites. For instance, court orders obtained by the BPI in October 2013 resulted in the blocking of 21 file-sharing sites including FilesTube and Torrentz. There is a private agreement in principle between leading ISPs and rights holders, made with encouragement from government, to quickly restrict access to websites when presented with court orders. The court orders are not made public and "overblocking" is sometimes reported, such as the accidental blocking of the Radio Times, Crystal Palace F.C., Taylor Swift and over 100 other websites in August 2013.

The practice originated as a result of a court order applied against an incidence of copyright infringement that was taken out by the Motion Picture Association in December 2010 at the request of Hollywood studios. The Association applied for an injunction to block access to NewzBin2, a site which provided a search service for UseNet content, indexing downloads of copyrighted content including movies and other material shared without permission. The application was lodged against BT, the largest Internet service provider in the United Kingdom with around six million customers. It required BT to use Cleanfeed to block its customers' access to the site. In July 2011 the High Court of Justice granted the injunction and in October 2011 BT was ordered to block access to the website within fourteen days, the first ruling of its kind under UK copyright law. The precedent set was described by the Open Rights Group as "dangerous".

BT did not appeal against the ruling and put the required block in place on 2 November 2011. Subsequent attempts to access the site from a BT IP address were met with the message "Error – site blocked". Newzbin released client software to circumvent the BT blocking, using encryption and the Tor network. Newzbin claimed that over 90% of its active UK users had downloaded its workaround software making the BT block ineffective. However, further court orders resulted in Sky blocking access to Newzbin in December 2011 and Virgin Media blocking access to the site in August 2012. On 28 November 2012 Newzbin announced the closure of its indexing service.

Meanwhile, in May 2012 the High Court ordered the blocking of The Pirate Bay by UK ISPs to prevent further copyright infringing movie and music downloads from the website. The blocks were said to be quickly bypassed and a spokesman for The Pirate Party said public interest in the service following the ban had boosted traffic to the party's website. In December 2012, the British Phonographic Industry (BPI) threatened legal action against The Pirate Party after the party refused demands sent at the end of November to remove their proxy to The Pirate Bay.

In September 2013 an Ofcom survey revealed that 2% of Internet users are responsible for 74% of all copyright-infringing downloads in the UK, and that 29% of all downloads are of content which violates copyright.

In October 2014 the first blocking order against trademark infringing consumer goods was passed against the major UK ISPs by Richemont, Cartier International and Montblanc to block several domains.

=== ISP Default network blocking ===
Internet customers in the UK are prohibited from accessing a range of web sites by default, because they have their Internet access filtered by their ISPs. The filtering programme has applied to new ISP customers since the end of 2013, and has been extended to existing users on a rolling basis. A voluntary code of practice agreed by all four major ISPs means that customers have to 'opt out' of the ISP filtering to gain access to the blocked content. However, the complex nature of the active monitoring systems means that users cannot usually opt out of the monitoring and re-routing of their data traffic, something which may render their data security vulnerable. The range of content blocked by ISPs can be varied over time.

==== History ====
The idea for default filtering originated from manifesto commitments concerning "the commercialisation and sexualisation of childhood" given by the parties forming the Cameron–Clegg coalition government in 2010. This was followed by a review (the Bailey Review) and a consultation by the UK Council for Child Internet Safety (UKCCIS). Campaigning by Claire Perry MP and the Daily Mail newspaper resulted in significant public support for the idea of Internet filtering for the purposes of child protection. By 2013 there had already been considerable adoption of in-home filtering, with 43% of homes with children aged 5–15 having filters installed on their family computer. Nevertheless, Prime Minister David Cameron made it clear in July 2013 that his aim was to ensure that by the end of 2013 all ISPs would have a filtering system in place. As a result, three of the Big 4 major ISPs (TalkTalk, Sky and BT) began applying default filtering to new customers in 2013 with the fourth major ISP, Virgin, doing so in February 2014. Default filtering of existing customers was implemented by all four major ISPs during 2014 with the aim of ensuring that the system applied to 95% of all households by the end of the year.

TalkTalk already had content-control software available to comply with government requirements. Their HomeSafe internet filtering system was introduced in May 2011 as an opt-in product and was used for default filtering of new customers from March 2012. HomeSafe was praised by Cameron and is controlled and operated by the Chinese company Huawei. After initial resistance other ISPs had to commission new filtering systems to fulfil Government demands. Some smaller ISPs expressed their reluctance to take part in filtering, citing concerns over costs and civil liberties but the government stated: "We expect the smaller ISPs to follow the lead being set by the larger providers". Cameron said ISPs should choose their own preferred technical solution, but would be monitored to ensure filtering was done correctly. Nevertheless, the ISP Andrews & Arnold does not censor any of its Internet connection all its broadband packages guarantee a 12-month notice should it start to censor any of its traffic.

In July 2014 Ofcom released a report into filter implementation and effectiveness across the fixed-line ISPs. At that point the Big 4 major fixed-line ISPs comprised 93% of the broadband market. They were all mandating filters be enabled as default for new customers, but overall take-up figures were low, with BT (5%), Sky (8%) and Virgin (4%). The figure was higher for TalkTalk (36%) as there had already been significant take-up of its system during the preceding three years. The industry average was 13%. In January 2015 Sky went further, blocking all material deemed unsuitable for children under the age of 13 for any of its five million customers who had not already opted out. In the same month Talk Talk announced that customers who had not chosen whether to activate the company's filtering system would have to opt out if they wished it to be turned off. In January 2016 Sky began sending all new and existing customers an email asking if they want to turn the filter on. Those customers who ignore the email have the filter turned on automatically.

==== Legal status ====
The initial legal status of ISP web blocking was voluntary, although there were a number of attempts to introduce legislation to move it onto a mandatory footing. David Cameron first announced such legislation in July 2013 but default filtering was rejected at the September 2013 conference of the Liberal Democrats (the Coalition Government's minor partner) and no Government legislation to this effect occurred during the 2010-15 Parliament.

Prior to the 2015 United Kingdom general election both the opposition Labour Party and the governing Conservative Party said that, if elected, they would legislate on the issue. Labour said that it would introduce mandatory filters based on BBFC ratings if it believed that voluntary filtering by ISPs had failed. The Conservatives said that they would give an independent regulator such as ATVOD the legal power to compel internet service providers to block sites which failed to include effective age verification. The Digital Economy Act 2017 placed the requirement for ISP filtering into law and introduced a requirement for ISPs to block pornographic sites with inadequate age verification.

Proposals to create a single digital market for European Union (EU) member states include rules for net neutrality. These rules require that all internet traffic has to be treated equally, without blocking or slowing down certain data. Net neutrality guidelines were announced in August 2016 by the Body of European Regulators of Electronic Communications. It was thought that the rules might restrict the legality of ISP filtering after 2016. In May 2014 the government suggested it would veto European net neutrality legislation due to its conflict with web blocking programmes. In May 2015, a leaked Council of the European Union document on the topic of net neutrality suggested users would have to opt into blocks, rather than opt out as per the current UK government's plans. John Carr of the UK Council for Child Internet Safety said of the proposals: "a major plank of the UK’s approach to online child protection will be destroyed at a stroke". However, the requirement that a UK government adheres to EU rules on net neutrality may have disappeared when the United Kingdom left the European Union.

==== Overblocking and underblocking ====
Wide-scale inadvertent "overblocking" has been observed since ISP default filtering was introduced at the end of 2013. Legitimate sites are regularly blocked by the filters of some UK ISPs and mobile operators. In December 2013 the UK Council for Child Internet Safety met with ISPs, charities, representatives from government, the BBFC and mobile phone operators to seek ways to reduce the blocking of educational advice for young people. In January 2014 UKCCIS began constructing a whitelist of the charity-run educational sites for children that had been overblocked. The intention was to provide the list to ISPs to allow unblocking.

Examples of overblocked categories reported include:

- sex education and advice on sexual health
- help with sex and pornography addiction
- support services for rape and domestic abuse
- child protection services
- suicide prevention
- libraries
- parliament, government and politicians
- drug advice

The identification of overblocked sites is made particularly difficult by the fact that ISPs do not provide checking tools to allow website owners to determine whether their site is being blocked. In July 2014 the Open Rights Group launched an independent checking tool blocked.org.uk, a revamp of their mobile blocking site to report details of blocking on different fixed line ISPs and mobile providers. The tool revealed that 19% of 100,000 popularly visited websites were being blocked (with significant variation between ISPs) although the percentage of sites hosting legal pornographic material is thought to be around 4%.

In 2019 an in-depth investigation into overblocking by the Open Rights Group and digital privacy site Top10VPN.com found that thousands of websites were being incorrectly blocked. These included relatively harmless example from industries such as wedding planning and photography, to more damaging and dangerous mistakes like official websites for charities, schools and mental health support.

Significant underblocking has also been discovered, with ISPs failing to block up to 7% of adult sites tested. A study commissioned by the European Commission's Safer Internet Programme which tested parental control tools showed that underblocking for adult content ranged from 5-35%.

==== Criticism ====
In favour

Proponents of internet filtering primarily refer to the need to combat the early sexualisation of children. The government believes that "broadband providers should consider automatically blocking sex sites, with individuals being required to opt in to receive them, rather than opt out and use the available computer parental controls." In 2010 communications minister Ed Vaizey was quoted as saying, "This is a very serious matter. I think it is very important that it's the ISPs that come up with solutions to protect children."

Against

The Washington Post described the UK's ISP filtering systems as creating "some of the strictest curbs on pornography in the Western world". There is no public scrutiny of the filtering lists. This creates the potential for them to be expanded to stifle dissent for political ends, as has happened in some other countries. The British Prime Minister of the time David Cameron stated that Internet users will have the option to turn the filters off, but no legislation exists to ensure that option will remain available.

In March 2014, president Diane Duke of the United States-based Free Speech Coalition argued against the censorship rules at a London conference sponsored by Virgin Media. The discussion was titled "Switched on Families: Does the Online World Make Good Things Happen?". The panel included government representatives such as Member of Parliament Claire Perry, members of the press, and supporters of an open Internet such representatives from the UK Council for Child Internet Safety, the Family Online Safety Institute, and Big Brother Watch. A report on the meeting was printed in The Guardian on 5 March 2014. Duke was quoted as saying, "The filters Prime Minister Cameron supports block sexual health sites, they block domestic violence sites, they block gay and lesbian sites, they block information about eating disorders and a lot of information to which it's crucial young people have access. Rather than protect children from things like bullying and online predators, these filters leave children in the dark."

The Open Rights Group has been highly critical of the blocking programmes, especially mobile blocking and ISP default blocking. New Statesman magazine observed that overblocking means “the most vulnerable people in society are the most likely to be cut off from the help they need”.

==== Categories blocked ====
In July 2013 the Open Rights Group discovered from the ISPs that a wide range of content categories would be blocked. Blocking has subsequently been detected in all the categories listed by the ISPs apart from 'anorexia and eating disorder websites' and 'esoteric material'. More information was gained following the launch of blocked.org.uk by the Open Rights Group, when TalkTalk gave additional detail about their default blocked categories and BT identified their default filtering level (light).

Category	TalkTalk Homesafe	BT Family Protection	Sky Broadband Shield	Virgin Media Web Safe
Dating	(Default) Dating	(Light) Dating	(13) Dating	^{Possibly not due to dating.virginmedia.com}
Drugs	(Default) Drugs, Alcohol and Tobacco	(Light) Drugs	(13) Drugs and Criminal Skills	Drugs
Alcohol and tobacco	(Default) Drugs, Alcohol and Tobacco	(Light) Alcohol & Tobacco		
File sharing	File Sharing Sites	(Strict) File Sharing	(13) Anonymizers, Filesharing and Hacking	
Gambling	(Default) Gambling	(Moderate) Gambling	^{Not blocked due to Sky Betting and Gaming division}	^{Probably not blocked due to Virgin Gaming division}
Games	Games; Homework Time	(Strict) Games; Homework Time	(PG) Online Gaming	^{Probably not blocked due to Virgin Gaming division}
Pornography	(Default) Pornography	(Light) Pornography	(13) Pornography and Adult	Pornography
Nudity		(Moderate) Nudity		
Social networking and web forums	Social Networking; Homework Time	(Moderate) Social Networking; Homework Time	(PG) Social Networking	^{Not blocked}
Suicide and self-harm	(Default) Suicide and Self Harm	(Light) Hate and Self-harm	(13) Suicide and Self Harm	Self-harm and Suicide
Weapons and violence	(Default) Weapons and Violence	(Moderate) Weapons and Violence	(13) Weapons, Violence, Gore and Hate	Violence
Obscenity		(Light) Obscene and Tasteless		
Criminal skills		(Light) Obscene and Tasteless	(13) Drugs and Criminal Skills	Crime
Hate		(Light) Hate and Self-harm	(13) Weapons, Violence, Gore and Hate	Hate
Media streaming		(Strict) Media Streaming		
Fashion and beauty		(Strict) Fashion and Beauty		
Gore		(Light) Obscene and Tasteless	(13) Weapons, Violence, Gore and Hate	
Cyberbullying	^{Not blocked}	^{No}	(13) Cyber Bullying	
Hacking		(Light) Obscene and Tasteless	(13) Anonymizers, Filesharing and Hacking	Hacking
School cheating sites		(Custom) Homework Time		
Sex education Gay and Lesbian Lifestyle		(Custom) Sex Education		
Search engines		(Custom) Search Engines and Portals		
(Optional) Phishing, malware and spyware	Virus Alerts		(18) Phishing, Malware and Spyware	
Web-blocking circumvention tools		^{When any filtering enabled}	(13) Anonymizers, Filesharing and Hacking	

=== Mobile Internet blocking ===
UK mobile phone operators began filtering Internet content in 2004 when Ofcom published a "UK code of practice for the self-regulation of new forms of content on mobiles". This provided a means of classifying mobile Internet content to enable consistency in filtering. All major UK operators now voluntarily filter content by default.

When users try to access blocked content they are redirected to a warning page. This tells them that they are not able to access an 'over 18 status' Internet site and a filtering mechanism has restricted their access. Categories that are listed as blocked include: adult / sexually explicit, chat, criminal skills, drugs, alcohol and tobacco, gambling, hacking, hate, personal and dating, violence, and weapons. Users who are adults may have the block lifted on request.

Guidelines published by the Independent Mobile Classification Body were used by mobile operators to classify sites until the British Board of Film Classification took over responsibility in 2013. Classification determines whether content is suitable for customers under 18 years old. The default assumption is that a user is under 18.

The following content types must be blocked from under 18's:

- Suicide, self-harm, pro-anorexia and eating disorders
- Discriminatory language
- Encouragement of drug use
- Repeated / aggressive use of 'cunt'
- Pornography restrictions
- Violence and gore restrictions

Significant overblocking of Internet sites by mobile operators is reported, including the blocking of political satire, feminism and gay content. Research by the Open Rights Group highlighted the widespread nature of unjustified site blocking. In 2011 the group set up blocked.org.uk, a website allowing the reporting of sites and services that are 'blocked' on their mobile network. The website received hundreds of reports of the blocking of sites covering blogs, business, internet privacy and internet forums across multiple networks. The Open Rights Group also demonstrated that correcting the erroneous blocking of innocent sites can be difficult. No UK mobile operator provides an on-line tool for identifying blocked websites. The O2 Website status checker was available until the end of 2013 but was suspended in December after it had been widely used to determine the extent of overblocking by O2. Not only were civil liberties and computing sites being blocked, but also Childline, the NSPCC and the Police. An additional opt-in whitelist service aimed at users under 12 years is provided by O2. The service only allows access to websites on a list of categories deemed suitable for that age group.

=== Internet Watch Foundation ===
==== Introduction ====
Between 2004 and 2006, BT Group introduced its Cleanfeed content blocking system technology to implement 'section 97A' orders. BT spokesman Jon Carter described Cleanfeed's function as "to block access to illegal Web sites that are listed by the Internet Watch Foundation", and described it as essentially a server hosting a filter that checked requested URLs for Web sites on the IWF list, and returning an error message of "Web site not found" for positive matches. Cleanfeed is a silent content filtering system, which means that Internet users cannot ascertain whether they are being regulated by Cleanfeed, experiencing connection failures, or if the page really does not exist. The proportion of Internet service providers using Cleanfeed by the beginning of 2006 was 80% and this rose to 95% by the middle of 2008. In February 2009, the Government said that it was looking at ways to cover the final 5%.

According to a small-sample survey conducted in 2008 by Nikolaos Koumartzis, an MA researcher at London College of Communication, the vast majority of UK based Internet users (90.21%) were unaware of the existence of Cleanfeed software. Moreover, nearly two thirds of the participants did not trust British Telecommunications or the IWF to be responsible for a silent censorship system in the UK. A majority would prefer to see a message stating that a given site was blocked and to have access to a form for unblocking a given site.

Cleanfeed originally targeted only alleged child sexual abuse content identified by the Internet Watch Foundation. However, no safeguards exist to stop the secret list of blocked sites being extended to include sites unrelated to child pornography. This had led to criticism of Cleanfeed's lack of transparency which gives it considerable potential for broad censorship. Further, Cleanfeed has been used to block access to copyright-infringing websites after a court order in 2011 required BT to block access to NewzBin2. This has led some to describe Cleanfeed as the most perfectly invisible censorship mechanism ever invented and to liken its powers of censorship to those employed currently by China. There are risks that increasing Internet regulation will lead the Internet to be even more restricted in the future.

Non-BT ISPs now implement the child abuse image content list with their in-house technologies to implement IWF blocking.

==== IWF/Wikipedia controversy ====
On 5 December 2008 the IWF system blacklisted a Wikipedia article on the Scorpions album Virgin Killer. A statement by the organisation's spokesman alleged that the album cover, displayed in the article, contained "a potentially illegal indecent image of a child under the age of 18". Users of major ISPs, including Virgin Media, Be/O2/Telefónica, EasyNet/UK Online, Demon and Opal, were unable to access the content, despite the album cover being available unfiltered on other major sites including Amazon.co.uk, and available for sale in the UK. The system also started proxying users, who accessed any Wikipedia article, via a minimal number of servers, which resulted in site administrators having to block them from editing Wikipedia or creating accounts. On 9 December, the IWF removed the article from its blacklist, stating: "IWF's overriding objective is to minimise the availability of indecent images of children on the Internet, however, on this occasion our efforts have had the opposite effect."

=== Public Wi-Fi ===
The vast majority of the Internet access provided by Wi-Fi systems in public places in the UK is filtered with many sites being blocked. The filtering is done voluntarily by the six largest providers of public Wi-Fi: Arqiva, BT, Sky, Nomad Digital, Virgin and O2, who together are responsible for 90% public Wi-Fi. The filtering was introduced as a result of an agreement put in place in November 2013 between the Government and the Wi-Fi providers. Pressure from the Government and the UK Council for Child Internet Safety had already led Virgin and O2 to install filtering on the Wi-Fi systems on the London Underground and McDonald's restaurants, but half of all public Wi-Fi networks remained unfiltered in September 2013.

"Overblocking" is a problem reported with public Wi-Fi filters. Research in September 2013 indicated that poorly programmed filters blocked sites when a prohibited tag appeared coincidentally within an unrelated word. Religious sites were blocked by nearly half of public Wi-Fi filters and sex education sites were blocked by one third. In November 2013, there were complaints about the blocking of Gay websites that were not related to sex or nudity on the public Wi-Fi provided by train operating companies. The filtering was done by third party organisations and these were criticised for being both unidentified and unaccountable. Such blocking may breach the Equality Act 2010. The government arranged for the UK Council for Child Internet Safety to investigate whether filters were blocking advice to young people in areas such as sex education.

=== Libraries and educational institutions ===
Many libraries in the UK such as the British Library and local authority public libraries apply filters to Internet access. According to research conducted by the Radical Librarians Collective, at least 98% of public libraries apply filters; including categories such as "LGBT interest", "abortion" and "questionable". Some public libraries block Payday loan websites and Lambeth Council has called for other public Wi-fi providers to block these sites too.

The majority of schools and colleges use filters to block access to sites which contain adult material, gambling and sites which contain malware. YouTube, Facebook and Twitter are often filtered by schools. Some universities also block access to sites containing a variety of material. Many students often use proxy servers to bypass this. Schools often censor pupils' Internet access in order to offer some protection against various perceived threats such as cyber-bullying and the perceived risk of grooming by paedophiles; as well as to maintain pupil attention during IT lessons. Examples of overblocking exist in the school context. For instance, in February 2014 the website of the Yes Scotland pro-independence campaign was blocked in a Glasgow school while the rival Better Together pro-union website was not blocked.

== Planned programmes ==
=== Extremism ===
The Counter Terrorism Internet Referral Unit (CTIRU), which was set up in 2010 by the Association of Chief Police Officers and run by the Metropolitan Police Service, maintains a list of sites and content that in their opinion incites or glorifies terrorist acts under Section 3 of the Terrorism Act 2006. This list is passed to the public estate institutions so that access to the sites can be blocked. ISPs BT, Sky, TalkTalk and Virgin Media incorporate the CTIRU block list into their filters. The CTIRU also issues removal requests if the Internet content is hosted in the UK. The UK is the only country in the world with such a unit. Home Office proposals in 2006 requiring ISPs to block access to articles "glorifying terrorism" were rejected and the government opted for a takedown approach at that time. However, in December 2013 the Prime Minister's extremism task force proposed that where such material is hosted overseas, ISPs should block the websites, and David Cameron gave orders that the CTIRU list be extended to UK ISPs. The UK government has defined extremism as: "Vocal or active opposition to fundamental British values, including democracy, the rule of law, individual liberty and mutual respect and tolerance of different faiths and beliefs."

This approach to web blocking has been criticised for being extra-parliamentary and extrajudicial and for being a proactive process where authorities actively seek out material to ban. Additionally, concerns have been expressed by ISPs and freedom of speech advocates that these measures could lead to the censorship of content that is “extremist” but not illegal. Indeed, the United Kingdom security minister James Brokenshire said in March 2014 that the government should also deal with material "that may not be illegal but certainly is unsavoury and may not be the sort of material that people would want to see or receive".

== Unimplemented and pending proposals ==
=== Social media and communications ===
On 11 August 2011, following the widespread riots in England, British Prime Minister David Cameron said that Theresa May, the Home Secretary, would meet with executives of the Web companies Facebook and Twitter, as well as Research In Motion, maker of the BlackBerry smartphone, to discuss possible measures to prevent troublemakers from using social media and other digital communications tools. During a special debate on the riots, Cameron told Parliament:

Everyone watching these horrific actions will be struck by how they were organised via social media. Free flow of information can be used for good. But it can also be used for ill. And when people are using social media for violence we need to stop them. So we are working with the police, the intelligence services and industry to look at whether it would be right to stop people communicating via these Web sites and services when we know they are plotting violence, disorder and criminality”.

Critics said that the British government was considering policies similar to those it has criticised in totalitarian and one-party states. And in the immediate aftermath of the 2011 England riots, Iran, often criticised by the West for restricting the Internet and curbing free speech, offered to "send a human rights delegation to Britain to study human rights violations in the country".

On 25 August 2011 British officials and representatives of Twitter, Facebook and BlackBerry met privately to discuss voluntary ways to limit or restrict the use of social media to combat crime and periods of civil unrest. The government was seeking ways to crack down on networks being used for criminal behavior, but was not seeking any additional powers and had no intention of restricting Internet services. It was not clear what new measures, if any, would be taken as a result of the meeting.

=== Private members' bills ===
A private members bill requiring ISPs, mobile phone operators and equipment manufacturers to filter adult content was introduced into the House of Lords in May 2012 by Baroness Howe of Idlicote. The Online Safety Bill was criticised for its potential to block any service that appears to provide adult material unless it is on an Ofcom-approved list. The original bill did not succeed due to a lack of Government support. It was re-introduced in May 2015 and failed a second time.

In September 2014 as a proposed addition to UK legislation against revenge porn, Geraint Davies MP introduced a private member's bill mandating devices that can access the Internet be filtered by default at the threat of fining non-compliant manufacturers.

whereby if mobile phones, computers and other devices that have access to the internet are not sold in a default position without that access—that is, if the user has to switch it on or contact the supplier—we could fine the manufacturers

After the bill's first reading there was no debate and the bill made no further progress.

Although these legislative approaches were unsuccessful as private member' bills, their measures may appear in a future Government Communications Bill.

=== Online Harms White Paper ===
In 2019, the UK government published its Online Harms White Paper, which covers many of the "online harms" discussed above. The government's new proposed solution to these problems is to introduce a wide-ranging regime of Internet regulation in the United Kingdom, enforcing codes of practice on Internet companies, which would be subject to a statutory duty of care, and the threat of punishment or blocking if the codes are not complied with.

=== Online Safety Bill ===
Building on the Online Harms White Paper, in 2021 the UK government under Boris Johnson published a draft Online Safety Bill establishing a statutory duty of care of online platforms towards their users. Enacted in October 2023, the bill imposes substantial fines on online platforms that fail to take action against illegal and "legal but harmful" content, and also grants Ofcom the power to block access to infringing websites. However, the bill also obliges social media networks to protect journalistic as well as "democratically important" content, such as comments supporting or opposing particular political parties and policies, and ban discrimination against particular political viewpoints.

== Technologies ==
=== By ISP ===
A service provider will integrate some or all its feeds into a single filtering device or stack, sometimes in conjunction with an upstream provider performing additional filtering. The following content-control technologies have been confirmed to be used to implement all types of web blocking (includes virtual operators):

Company	Service	IWF	Parental controls	Copyright
Arqiva	Public wi-fi			
BT	Broadband and Infinity	Cleanfeed	Nominum	
BT	BT Wifi Protect		Symantec Rulespace	
BSkyB	The Cloud Public Wifi		Sonicwall	
BSkyB	Sky Broadband	Mohawk	Sky Shield; Symantec Rulespace via Xerocole	Hawkeye
EE	Mobile Networks: EE; Orange; T-Mobile		Symantec Rulespace	Procea ( Formally Arbor)
Hutchison 3G	3 Mobile			
Nomad Digital	Public transport Wifi			
TalkTalk Group	TalkTalk Broadband	Detica	Huawei	Service Inspection Gateway (SIG)
Telefónica UK	O2 Broadband and Mobile		Symantec Rulespace	StreamShield by Detica
Virgin Media	Virgin Media Broadband	Web Blocker 2	Web Safe; Nominum	Web Blocker 2
Virgin Media and EE	London Underground Wifi		Nominum	
Vodafone Mobile	Vodafone Mobile		Symantec Rulespace	

Rulespace and O2 are the only known services with a public categorisation and blocking check tool.

=== By feed type ===
Programme	Implementation
Corporate filtering (most possible)	SSL enabled deep packet inspection with URI blocking IP address blocking DNS hijacking
Child abuse image content list Extremist material blocking (proposed); Default ISP filters (BT, Virgin Media, TalkTalk); Mobile Internet filtering Wifi hotspot filtering Library and educational filtering	Deep packet inspection with URI Blocking; IP address blocking DNS hijacking
Technical threat blocking	Database built via deep packet inspection IP address blocking DNS hijacking
Copyright infringement site blocking	IP address blocking DNS hijacking
Default ISP filters (Sky)	DNS hijacking

== Circumvention ==
Site blocks can be circumvented using trivial methods through to complex methods such as use of Tor, VPNs, site specific and general web proxies, and other circumvention techniques.

=== Child abuse image content list ===
Due to the proxy server implementation of the IWF's child abuse image content list (formally Cleanfeed) system, websites that filter users by IP address, such as wikis and file lockers, will be significantly broken, even if only a tiny proportion of its content is flagged.

=== Copyright ===
In response to the increasing number of file sharing related blocks, a number of proxy aggregator sites, e.g. torrentproxies.com, have become popular. In addition to the following, proxy sites designed to circumvent blocks have been secretly blocked by ISPs, driving users to proxy comparison sites. The Pirate Bay created a version of Tor branded as the PirateBrowser specifically to encourage anonymity and circumvention of these blocks. On 5 August 2014, City of London Police Intellectual Property Crime Unit arrested a 20-year-old man in Nottingham on suspicion of operating a proxy server that allowed internet users to bypass blocks on many popular sites.

=== ISP default network blocking ===
Downloadable software enabling web browsers to bypass the ISP filtering began appearing in December 2013, and in 2014 versions began appearing for mobile Internet platforms.

== See also ==
- Internet censorship
- Internet censorship in the United Kingdom
- Proposed UK Internet age verification system
- List of content-control software
- List of websites blocked in the United Kingdom
- Internet in the United Kingdom
