= Counter-Terrorism Internet Referral Unit =

The Counter-Terrorism Internet Referral Unit (CTIRU) was set up in 2010 by ACPO (and run by the Metropolitan Police) to remove unlawful terrorist material content from the Internet, with a specific focus on UK based material. CTIRU works with internet platforms to identify content which breaches their terms of service and requests that they remove the content on a voluntary basis. CTIRU also compile a list of URLs for material hosted outside the UK which are blocked on networks of the public estate.

To date (as of December 2017), CTIRU is linked to the removal of 300,000 pieces of "illegal terrorist material" from the internet.

== Scope ==
The December 2013 report of the Prime Minister's Extremism Taskforce said that it would "work with internet companies to restrict access to terrorist material online which is hosted overseas but illegal under UK law" and "work with the internet industry to help them in their continuing efforts to identify extremist content to include in family-friendly filters" which would likely involve lobbying ISPs to add the CTIRU list to their filters without the need for additional legislation.

CTIRU hold responsibility for the implementation of aspects of the Counter-Terrorism and Security Act 2015, and are the custodians of the CTIRU list - a continuously updated proscribed list of websites that is considered under the act to be illegal to access or attempt to access. The CTIRU list details URLs that, for one reason or another, cannot or will not be removed from ISP's or search engines. The list is one of the strategies employed by the Government as part of its drive to implement the "Prevent" legislation. As of September 2016, all Schools, childcare facilities or organisations that provide care or facilities for children under the age of 18 in the UK, have a statutory duty to ensure their systems cannot be used to access any of these websites by using firewall technology or service providers that are members of the IWF (Internet Watch Foundation) and ensuring that the technology prevents access to sites featured on the CTIRU list.

== Legal basis ==
CTIRU makes an assessment of the legality of material before referring it on to platforms to consider it for removal:

"I underline the fact that any online activity by the three groups under consideration, including Facebook pages and Twitter accounts, has been referred to CTIRU. If it is assessed as illegal — there is a legal test that has to be met — CTIRU will flag it directly to Facebook and Twitter for removal."

CTIRU appear to assess content on the basis of UK terror legislation:

"All referrals are assessed by CTIRU against UK terrorism legislation (Terrorism Act 2000 and 2006). Those that breach this legislation are referred to industry for removal. If industry agrees that it breaches their terms and conditions, they remove it voluntarily."

Such a notice and assessment would provide "actual knowledge" of criminality by a platform, meaning that a platform would no longer be able to rely upon the defence available as part of the E-Commerce Directive that they are an intermediary "hosting" content without an awareness of it. Therefore, although a notice sent by CTIRU to a platform - requesting the removal of content - may request compliance on a voluntary basis, such a notice may also act to ensure that a platform is able to be considered as a "publisher" of the content for the purposes of future legal action if the notice is not complied with.

== See also ==
- Internet censorship in the United Kingdom
- Web blocking in the United Kingdom
