= File sharing in the United Kingdom =

File sharing in the United Kingdom relates to the distribution of digital media in that country. In 2010, there were over 18.3 million households connected to the Internet in the United Kingdom, with 63% of these having a broadband connection. There are also many public Internet access points such as public libraries and Internet cafes.

In 2009, an online survey undertaken by Harris Interactive on behalf of the British Phonographic Industry (BPI) stated that of 3,442 people surveyed in the UK, 1,012 (29%) reported downloading music from peer-to-peer networks, giving an indication of the level of file sharing occurring in the UK.

A survey by XTN Data in 2006 found that of the 1000 people interviewed, 28% admitted to having downloaded copyrighted material without paying for it.

== Legislation ==
The Copyright, Designs and Patents Act 1988 and the Digital Economy Act 2010 are applicable to and may be breached by file sharing activity.

The Copyright, Designs and Patents Act 1988 aims to protect the intellectual property rights of the creator or copyright holder. File sharing violates this act when the copyright owner has not given permission for its material to be shared.

The Digital Economy Act 2017 changed the penalties related to copyright infringement. The legislation is concerned more directly with copyright on the Internet than previous legislation that was more concerned with commercial abuse of copyright.

== Action to prevent illegal file sharing ==
Institutions such as the British Phonographic Industry (BPI) sought help from the government to force Internet service providers (ISPs) to identify those users suspected of file sharing and to take action against them. With the backing of the government this was made part of the Digital Economy Act and passed into law after parliamentary debate in April 2010. A list of domain names affected by court orders is maintained on the website ukispcourtorders.co.uk by BT plc, a similar list is hosted by Sky.

As a result of this pressure, the five main ISPs (BT, Virgin Media, Sky, TalkTalk, EE) became responsible for the notification of users identified by the BPI. The notification will be a cease and desist order that will threaten legal action if the behaviour continues or if a compensation payment is not made. Further steps can also be taken by ISP's, if the identified users continue to breach copyright, such as the restriction of the bandwidth available to them or even total disconnection and possible bans or suspensions from the Internet. The movie industry has also signed up to seek action against those it has determined to be persistent infringers of its copyrights.

However, amendments proposed in 2010 to the Digital Economy Bill by the industry regulator Ofcom, made ISPs with fewer than 400,000 subscribers exempt. Also exempt are ISPs that provide mobile broadband access due in part to the way in which this service operates. One of the main reasons for providing the exemption is the costs and time-scale required for smaller ISPs to put the monitoring in place.

The legality of the software used by ISPs to monitor the Internet activity of suspected illegal file-sharers has itself been called into question because of concerns over the privacy issues that its use raises. Virgin Media want to use new software called Cview, which monitors activity and compares any downloaded material to a database of copyrighted material in order to determine if there has been an infringement. As of 2010 this software was being evaluated for suitability by the European Commission and Ofcom with particular attention to whether the software violates privacy or data protection directives.

The music industry in Britain is not the only industry to seek action against illegal file sharing. The computer games industry, worth an estimated £2 billion, also sought compensation for copyright infringement. Five major game companies: Atari, Codemasters, TopWare Interactive, Reality Pump and Techland, sent notices to over 25,000 UK Internet users they feel have breached their copyright by downloading or sharing games on file sharing websites. The companies demanded a payment of £300 in order to settle the matter out of court, warning that non-payment would result in legal action. In what was a landmark case in terms of file sharing, one company, Topware Interactive, took a user, Isabella Barwinska, to court over copyright infringement of its game Dream Pinball 3D, which had been illegally downloaded, uploaded, and shared with many other users. The court found in favour of Topware Interactive and imposed a penalty of £16,000.

In July 2010 the music company, Ministry of Sound, also sent notices to Internet users it claimed had breached its copyright by downloading music tracks. Notices were sent to around 2,000 users via London lawyers Gallant Macmillan demanding a compensation payment of around £350 in order to avoid legal action. Many users have challenged these claims, stating either their innocence or challenging the legality of the action taken.

The BPI, however, does not support mass mailing to end users, preferring to target persistent uploaders who make copyrighted material available to others and persistent downloaders.

The BPI has also complained to Google about illegal downloads and the ease with which these can be located or identified using its search engine, believing that Google has a responsibility to help prevent access to such material and that links to the infringing materials should be removed. This material is not actually hosted by Google, but by sites locatable through the use of Google's services.

April 2012 saw the UK high court order five leading UK ISPs to block access to Swedish file sharing website The Pirate Bay. The case was brought after the ISPs refused to block the site voluntarily and after one ISP was ordered to block a similar site Newzbin2 in July 2011.

Discussions between the Intellectual Property Office, the Department for Culture, Media and Sport and search engines Google and Bing led to the announcement in February 2017 of a voluntary code of practice, under which websites associated with copyright violation would be demoted within search engine rankings. Implementation was expected to begin by the summer of that year.

=== Opposition ===
There are groups which actively oppose the actions taken by institutions like BPI and the government's copyright policy, most of these groups are opposed to either the criminalisation of file sharers or the privacy infringements from Internet monitoring. The Open Rights Group and Pirate Party UK are prominent examples. These groups are opposed to the copyright infringement provisions of the Digital Economy Act.

UK ISP TalkTalk has openly stated that they will refuse to send warning letters to their customers or hand over any of their personal information, even if it became a legal requirement for them to do so. TalkTalk has stated that the "government's plans to punish people suspected of illegal downloading are an assault on human rights", and pledged to fight government anti-piracy laws. In 2010 TalkTalk launched a major campaign, Don't Disconnect Us, against government plans to disconnect connections suspected of repeat copyright infringement.

Opposition has also come from English comedian, actor, writer, and director, Stephen Fry, who has defended non-commercial "piracy", supported TalkTalk's Don't Disconnect Us campaign and admitted to using BitTorrent to download episodes of House and 24.

== See also ==
- Anti-Counterfeiting Trade Agreement (ACTA)
- Censorship in the United Kingdom
- Copyright aspects of downloading and streaming
- Computer and network surveillance
- Copyright in the United Kingdom
- Copyright law of the European Union
- EU Copyright Directive
- Internet censorship in the United Kingdom
- Legal aspects of copyright infringement
- Legal aspects of file sharing
- List of websites blocked in the United Kingdom
