= CECP =

CECP may refer to:

- Chess Engine Communication Protocol
- Certified Executive Compensation Professional, a certification offered by WorldatWork
- Civil Estate Co-ordination Protocol, a set of guidelines related to management of the public estate in the United Kingdom
- CE-CP, a circular permutation in proteins
- Country Extended Code Page, EBCDIC encodings for the ISO-8859-1 character repertoire
