= Encryption ban proposal in the United Kingdom =

The UK encryption ban was a pledge by former British prime minister David Cameron to ban online messaging applications that offer end-to-end encryption, such as WhatsApp, iMessage, and Snapchat, under a nationwide surveillance plan. Cameron's proposal was in response to the services which allow users to communicate without providing the UK security services access to their messages, which in turn could allegedly allow suspected terrorists a safe means of communication.

== Proposal ==
On 15 January 2015, David Cameron asked American president Barack Obama to increase pressure on American Internet companies to work more closely with British intelligence agencies, in order to deny potential terrorists a "safe space" to communicate, as well as seeking co-operation to implement tighter surveillance controls. Under new proposals, messaging apps will have to either add a backdoor to their programs, or risk a potential ban within the UK. To justify the proposal to ban encryption, David Cameron claims that "In our country, do we want to allow a means of communication between people, which even in extremis, with a signed warrant from the home secretary personally, that we cannot read?" In defending surveillance of Internet messaging, Cameron pointed out that the British state already possessed the legal ability to read people's private letters and to surveil their private phone calls.

In July 2016, newly appointed home secretary Amber Rudd confirmed the proposed Investigatory Powers Bill would grant any Secretary of State the powers to force communication service providers to remove or disable end-to-end encryption.

== Criticism ==
The UK's Information Commissioner Christopher Graham criticized the plans by saying "We must avoid knee-jerk reactions. In particular, I am concerned about any compromising of effective encryption for consumers of online services." The ISPA claims that the proposal risks "undermining the UK's status as a good and safe place to do business". While David Cameron had also claimed that app providers have "a social responsibility to fight the battle against terrorism", the founder of Lavabit had also criticized the proposals, saying the introduction of backdoors would leave systems more vulnerable.

== Resultant legislation ==
The resulting legislation was the Investigatory Powers Act 2016 (nicknamed the Snoopers' Charter) which defined and expanded upon the electronic surveillance powers of the British intelligence community and Police. It also aims to improve the safeguards on the exercise of those powers.

== See also ==
- Mass surveillance in the United Kingdom
- Internet censorship in the United Kingdom
- Web blocking in the United Kingdom
