= Nomad Digital =

Internet provider

- Industry: Information technology
- Founded: 2002
- Founder: Graeme Lowdon; Nigel Wallbridge
- Headquarters: Newcastle upon Tyne, England
- Area served: Global
- Key people: Xavier Champaud(MD)
- Services: Wi-Fi; Condition monitoring Passenger information
- Parent: Alstom
- Website: www.nomad-digital.com

Nomad Digital is an Internet Protocol (IP) Connectivity provider to the transport sector. It deploys wireless broadband connections for trains, metros, trams and buses, including passenger Wi-Fi services and remote condition monitoring for on-board rail components. Headquartered in Newcastle upon Tyne in England, it operates globally.

== History ==
Nomad Digital was founded by Graeme Lowdon and Nigel Wallbridge in 2002. The co-founders met during the sale of the telecommunications business Wide Area Markets to the business-to-business Internet trading company J2C. Lowdon and Wallbridge identified an opportunity to increase bandwidth and hence provide high speed data and Internet connectivity to moving vehicles, such as trains, using the wireless WiMax system, which can operate through tunnels and underground. As well as providing Internet connectivity, wireless connectivity enables streaming of CCTV security images and allows onboard train equipment and systems to be checked in real time.

Initially funded by co-founders Lowdon and Wallbridge, in mid-2006 Amadeus Capital Partners with support from T-Mobile's Venture Fund (T-Venture) invested £8 million venture capital into Nomad. Prior to the acquisition by Alstom the company experienced significant mismanagement in the 3 years leading up to the sale. This resulted in significant financial and contractual losses and the resignations and subsequent departures of a high number of key staff. During this time the long term future of Nomad Digital was in serious doubt.

In December 2016, Alstom announced its acquisition of Nomad Digital for a consideration of €16 million from Amadeus Capital Partners, SEB Venture Capital and Deutsche Telekom. The transaction closed in January 2017.

The sale of Nomad Digital saw the removal of the majority of the management team that had caused the downturn in fortunes and safeguarded the future of business.

== Technology ==
Nomad Digital aggregates a number of communication methods (such as 3G/4G cellular and trackside wireless) to provide a data connection to the train. It connects this to its on-train network that runs along the length of the train and uses Wi-Fi access points in every carriage to create a public hotspot network, providing passengers with access to the public internet and (where available) to other entertainment and information services. The on-board Communications Control Unit also allows train systems to be remotely visible and monitored by the train operator in real-time.

== Operations ==
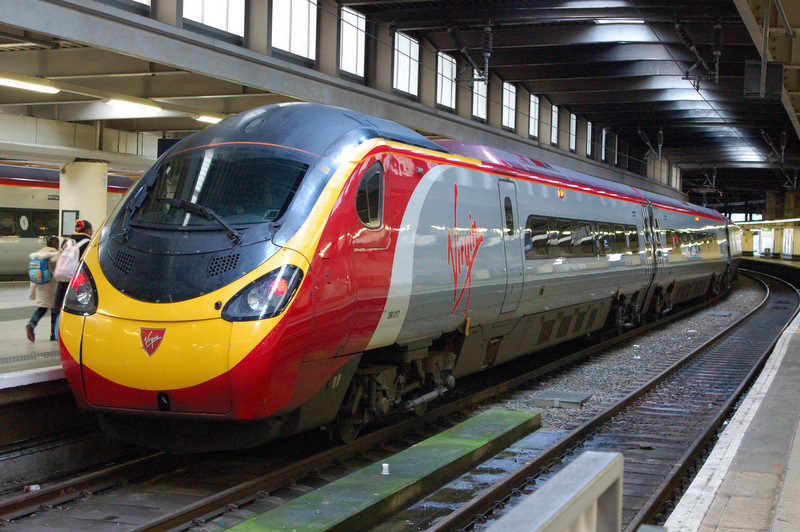
Virgin Trains West Coast Class 390 at London Euston

The company's first contract was with train operator Southern, offering broadband services on its Brighton to London Victoria service. In 2004, the contract was signed and the project was delivered in partnership with T-Mobile. In the UK, Abellio ScotRail, Arriva CrossCountry, East Midlands Trains, First Great Western, Heathrow Express, NI Railways, South West Trains and Virgin Trains West Coast have utilised Nomad's services.

In January 2014, Nomad was contracted to supply the equipment to support the provision of T-Mobile Wi-Fi and multimedia services for passengers travelling on the intercity services operated by Polish State Rail operator, PKP. Up to 300 rail vehicles were equipped with the technology, which also enabled remote condition monitoring of the individual cars and providing the facility to locate their position on the routes.

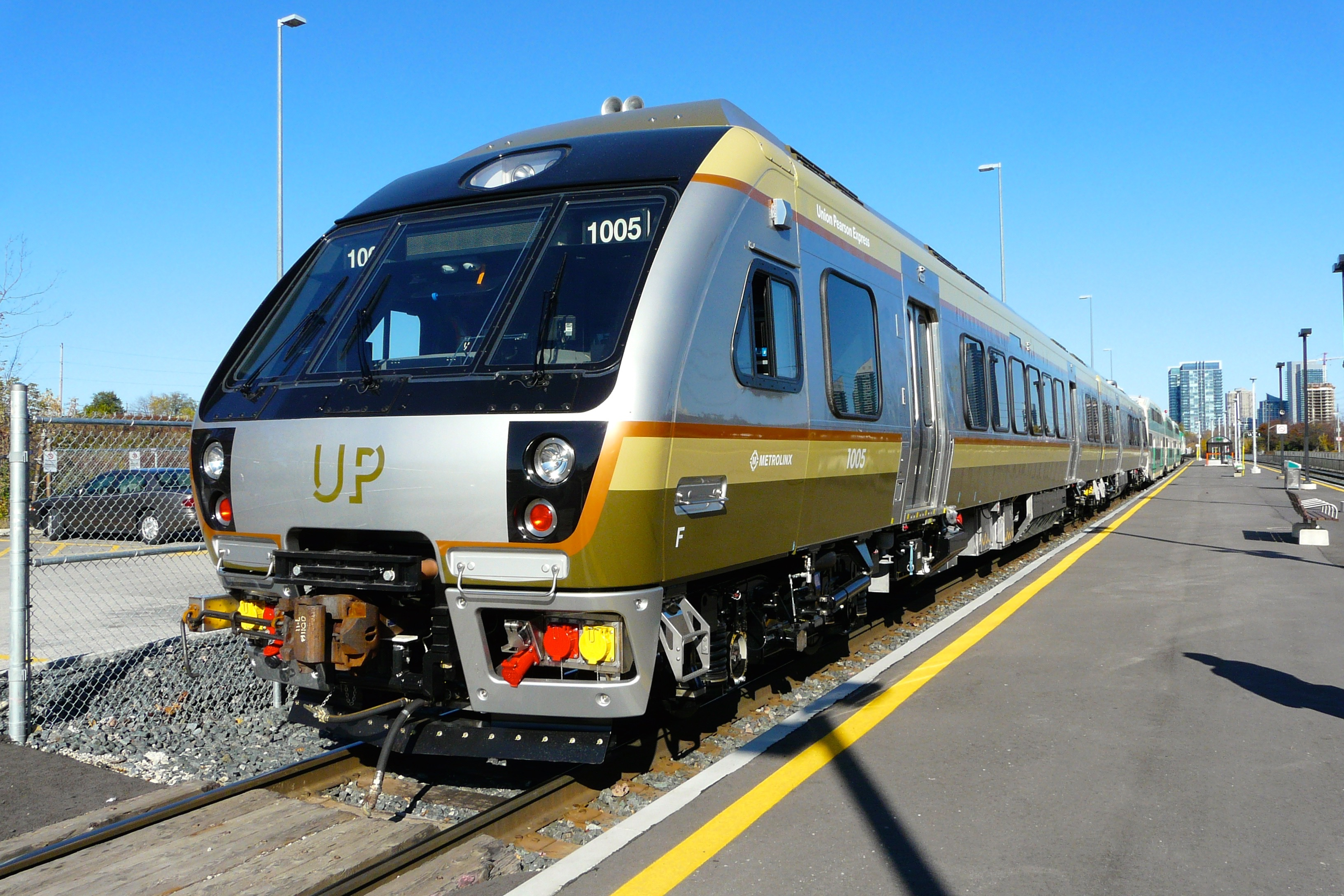
Union Pearson Express train at Mimico GO Station

Also in 2014, Nomad signed a contract with Virgin Trains to undertake a fleet-wide WiFi upgrade. The Nomad upgrade was deployed on 56 Pendolino and 20 Super Voyager trains.

In 2015, Nomad was contracted to provide the passenger Wi-Fi platform for Union Pearson Express that connects Union Station in downtown Toronto with Toronto Pearson International Airport, Canada's two busiest transportation hubs.

In June 2015, Nomad became the first transport technology company to join The Internet Watch Foundation. Nomad brought The IWF's fight against online crime to the railways, by offering an integration of an IWF-licensed service on all existing and future passenger Wi-Fi systems. Nomad is helping to protect UK train passengers from exposure to criminal online content.

In November 2015, Nomad established a 10-year partnership with ÖBB (Austrian Federal Railways) to deliver the world's largest multi-transport connectivity deployment. The partnership includes new on-board technology services for up to 900 ÖBB trains as well as 2,000 buses.

== Business expansion/acquisitions ==
In December 2013, Nomad was selected as part of the Future Fifty programme, an initiative launched earlier the same year by TechCity in conjunction with the UK Government. Nomad has also been listed in the Sunday Times Hiscox Tech Track 100 for four consecutive years. The Hiscox Tech Track 100 recognises Britain's fastest growing private technical companies, based on their average sales growth in the three-year period prior to selection.

In 2007 the company acquired Qinetiq Rail, with Qinetiq obtaining shares for a £1.5m investment in Nomad. In March 2013, the company acquired German-based Passenger Information System (PIS) supplier Inova (Hildesheim) and in October 2013 formed the joint venture, NomadTech with Portuguese company, EMEF, to address the requirements of the railway aftercare market to use wireless solutions in condition based maintenance. The technology has been deployed on over 140 trains of Norwegian State Railways (NSB) as part of its plans to reduce maintenance costs and improve fleet availability.

== Products ==
=== Passenger Wi-Fi/Portal/Infotainment ===
Infotainment solutions including onboard screens are developed in Nomad Digital's Hildesheim office in Germany.

In 2011, Nomad signed a contract with Eurostar to deliver onboard Wi-Fi and infotainment as part of a £700m fleet upgrade to improve services to passengers on the high-speed routes from London to Paris and Brussels. The upgrade, which includes the overhaul and refurbishment of existing trains and also the purchase of 10 new e320 trainsets from Siemens enables a high speed connection to the internet enabling passengers to stream content to their own devices at all times by means of a web portal.

=== Remote Online Condition Monitoring ===
In November 2013, Nomad Digital and EMEF, the primary Portuguese Railway maintenance company, formed a joint venture called Nomad Tech. Nomad's current ROCM customers include Vy, Comboios de Portugal and Metro Trains Melbourne.
