= R v Walker =

UK obscenity trial

- Court: Crown Court
- Full case name: Regina v Darryn Walker
- Decided: 29 June 2009

Court membership
- Judge sitting: Esmond Faulks J.

Case opinions
- If accepted expert evidence shows an article could only be located by those specifically searching for such material it will not be likely to corrupt readers

Keywords
- horrific literature; obscenity; internet; real-life living subjects; real person fiction

R v Walker was an English Crown Court case that was a test of the Obscene Publications Act 1959. It was the first such prosecution involving written material in nearly two decades and set a precedent in use of the act to prosecute web fiction. In October 2008, the defendant, civil servant Darryn Walker was charged with publishing an obscene story contrary to Section 2(1). It appeared on an Internet site. A newspaper sparked the prosecution as it involved a real person fiction erotic horror story about the murder of the members of British pop group Girls Aloud. The case was abruptly abandoned on its first day and the defendant was cleared of all charges.

== Decision to prosecute ==
The story, entitled "Girls (Scream) Aloud", had been posted from within the jurisdiction of the United Kingdom on a website hosted in the United States. Submitted under a pseudonym, the posting included a traceable email address. Officers from Scotland Yard’s Obscene Publications Unit decided to seek prosecution after consulting the Crown Prosecution Service (CPS), and on 25 September 2008 it was announced that this would occur for the online publication of material that the police and the CPS believed was obscene. It was the first such prosecution for written material since the landmark obscenity cases of the 1960s and 1970s. Any ruling would affect intended regulation of the Internet in the jurisdiction.

== Trial ==
Walker appeared in court on 22 October 2008 to face charges of "publishing an obscene article contrary to Section 2(1) of the Obscene Publications Act 1959". He was granted unconditional bail; the first day of the trial was organised for 16 March 2009. However, at the procedural preliminaries (directions) hearing in January, the defendant made it known that given the seriousness of the case he would be represented by a QC (Queen's Counsel), after which the Crown Prosecution Service gave notice of its intention to similarly employ one. The trial was postponed to 29 June 2009.

== Outcome ==
Walker appeared at Newcastle Crown Court on that day. The prosecution withdrew its case after hearing evidence from an information technology (IT) expert. The Crown Prosecution Service (CPS) explained that it had charged Walker as it believed that the story in question could be "easily accessed" by young fans of Girls Aloud. This was because of the definition of obscenity used in the act which requires prosecutors to prove that those exposed to the material were previously unaware of its obscene nature. Those who actively seek out such material are deemed unlikely to be corrupted by it. However, the IT expert showed that the article could only be located by those specifically searching for such material. A spokesperson for the CPS said that the prosecution was unable to provide sufficient evidence to contradict this new evidence and therefore no longer saw a realistic prospect of conviction. Mr Justice Faulks, presiding, directed the jury to return a formal verdict of not guilty to the charge.

== See also ==
- Internet Watch Foundation
- Internet censorship in the United Kingdom
