= Graeme Lowdon =

British businessman and entrepreneur (born 1965)

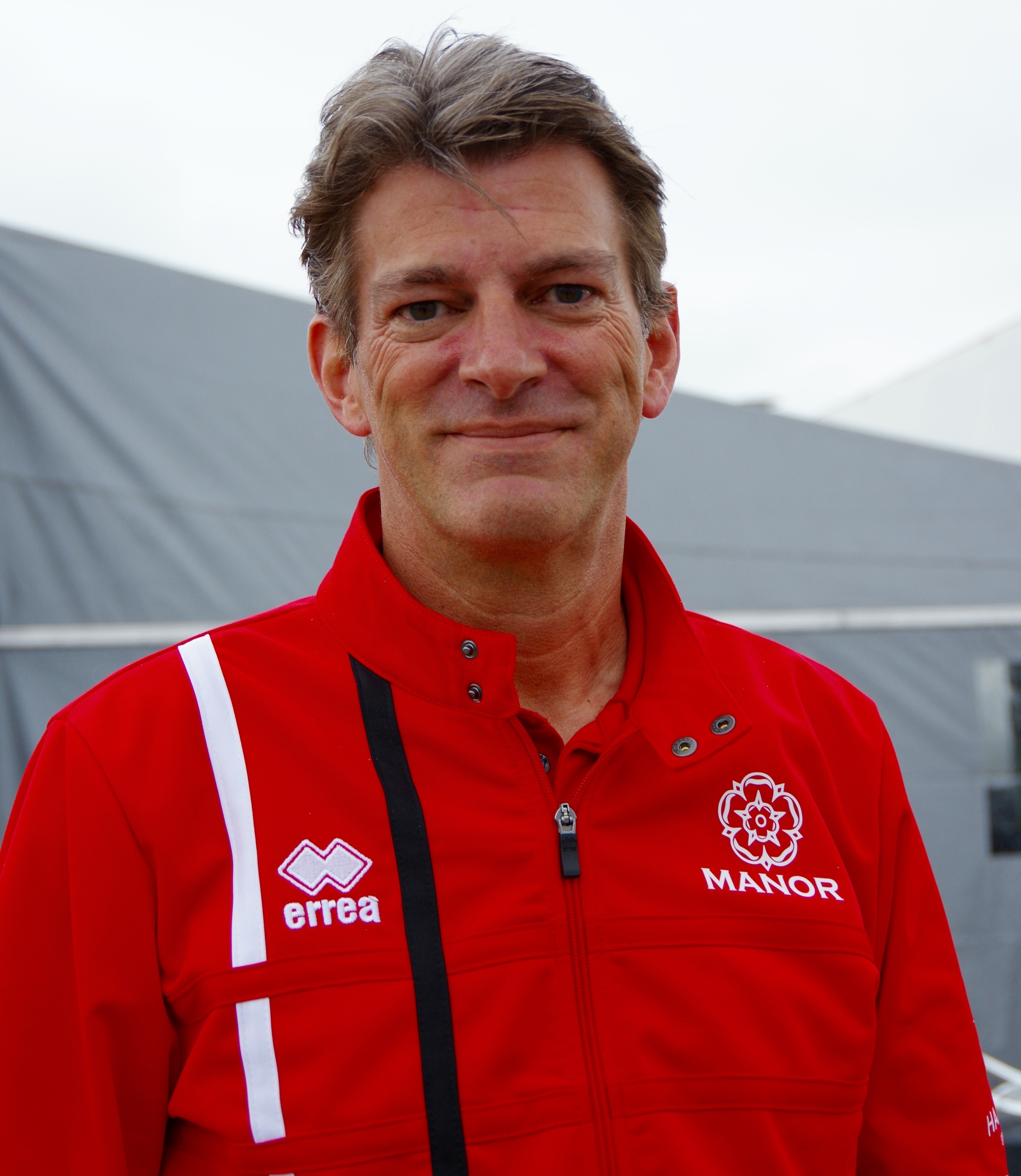
- Lowdon at the 2016 6 Hours of Silverstone
- Born: Graeme Paul Lowdon; 23 April 1965 (age 61)
- Education: Sheffield University (BSc), (MSc); Newcastle University (MSc)
- Occupations: Motorsport executive; Business executive; engineer
- Employers: Formula One; Virgin (2010–2011); Marussia (2012–2015); Cadillac (2026)
- Title: Team Principal

Graeme Paul Lowdon (born 23 April 1965) is a British businessman and entrepreneur who most recently was Team Principal for the Cadillac Formula 1 Team. Previously, he was Chief Executive Officer of the Virgin and Marussia Formula One teams.

== Career ==
Originally from Corbridge, Lowdon grew up in Stocksfield. He gained both a bachelor's and master's degree in mechanical engineering at Sheffield University, as well as an MBA from Newcastle University. Initially he worked in the power industry in the north of England and Singapore, before joining ABB Group working as part of the international sales force for their power station division. He identified that a potential client also ran an IndyCar team in the United States, and assisted in organising a sponsorship deal with the team.

In 1996, Lowdon returned to the UK and created Industry On-line, providing online trading platforms for industry. He also co-founded Eiger Racing, a Formula Renault racing team. Having secured investment from 3i, he developed Industry On-line into Just2Clicks, which was floated on the Alternative Investment Market in 2000. At the end of 2000, Lowdon joined Manor Motorsport in a non-executive commercial role. In 2002, he co-founded Nomad Digital, now the world's leading provider of data communications to the transportation sector, specialising in providing WiFi on trains.

Lowdon helped Manor Motorsport to develop into a Formula One team. Lowdon had strong links with Richard Branson's Virgin Group, Virgin Rail Group being one of Nomad's customers. He used these links to create the Virgin Racing team. On 30 October 2015, the team announced the resignation of both Lowdon and team boss John Booth from the team at the end of 2015, citing differences with team owner Stephen Fitzpatrick. He later returned to Manor Motorsport, overseeing its FIA World Endurance Championship programme. In December 2024, it was announced that Lowdon would become the team principal for the Cadillac Formula 1 Team, which debuted in 2026.

In August 2026, he was replaced by Marcin Budkowski as Team Principal of Cadillac Formula 1.
