= Andrews & Arnold =

British Internet service provider

Coordinates: 51°24′55″N 0°45′55″W

Andrews & Arnold Ltd
- Type: Private
- Industry: ISP
- Founded: 1997; 29 years ago
- Headquarters: Bracknell, England
- Area served: United Kingdom
- Key people: Adrian Kennard (managing director)
- Products: Internet services
- Website: www.aa.net.uk

Andrews & Arnold Ltd (also known as AAISP or A&A) is an Internet service provider based in Bracknell, England. Launched in 1998, the company serves businesses and home users.

== History ==
Founded in 1997 and launched in 1998, the company initially only offered services over BT Wholesale, then in 2013 began offering services over TalkTalk Wholesale. In the UK, ADSL, FTTC and FTTP lines are typically served from the same local Openreach infrastructure, although A&A's use of multiple carriers enables diverse backhaul from telephone exchanges using TalkTalk's local-loop unbundling presence.

In November 2022, Andrews & Arnold began offering FTTP services over the CityFibre network in England and Wales, marking their first services that do not make use of the Openreach network.

== Operations ==
Andrews & Arnold offers broadband packages for large and small businesses, and home users.

The company's owner, Adrian Kennard, stated in a blog post that as of October 2010, the company is "xkcd/806" compliant, referring to xkcd comic number 806. This means that technical support callers who say the code word "shibboleet" will be transferred to a technical support representative who knows at least two programming languages.

Andrews & Arnold opposes censorship of Internet connections. In 2015–2017, Kennard published several blog posts discussing why Internet censorship as discussed in the UK is not workable.

Andrews & Arnold provides optional bonded multiple-link internet access. Links can be of different types; each needs only to be a pipe that can carry IP packets.

== Awards and recognition ==
The company was judged as the best niche internet service provider according to the Thinkbroadband Customer Service Awards in 2010. In 2021, it was voted as the best broadband provider in the UK on the ISPreview website.
