= Online Harms White Paper =

White paper produced by the British government

The Online Harms White Paper is a white paper produced by the British government in April 2019. It lays out the government's proposals on dealing with "online harms", which it defines as "online content or activity that harms individual users, particularly children, or threatens our way of life in the UK, either by undermining national security, or by reducing trust and undermining our shared rights, responsibilities and opportunities to foster integration", but excluding harm to businesses, harm from data breaches, and harm caused by activity on the dark web, all of which are dealt with by other government initiatives.

The government's proposed solution to these problems is to introduce a wide-ranging regime of Internet regulation in the United Kingdom, enforcing codes of practice on Internet companies, which would be subject to a statutory duty of care, and the threat of punishment or blocking if the codes are not complied with.

Following the abandonment of the proposed UK Internet age verification system in October 2019, the Culture Secretary Nicky Morgan stated that the government would seek to follow the White Paper's approach to regulation as an alternative.

== See also ==
- Media regulation
- Online Safety Act 2023
- Self-censorship
- Web blocking in the United Kingdom
- The Sex Workers Union
