= SEB Venture Capital =

Swedish venture capital firm

SEB Venture Capital - the venture capital arm of the Swedish bank SEB - invest capital and supply expertise and a broad network of contacts.

SEB Venture Capital is an independent unit within SEB with its own board. A network with representatives from both industry and the service sector as well as institutions within universities, colleges and research is linked to the operation. Since its inception in 1995, SEB Venture Capital has made over 100 investments and close to 70 company sales. Today there are roughly 30 companies in the portfolio.
