= Cleanfeed (content blocking system) =

Internet blocking system in the United Kingdom and Canada

Cleanfeed was the name given to various privately administered ISP level content filtering systems operating in the United Kingdom, Canada, and Australia with a view to future mandatory implementation. These government-mandated programs originally attempted to block access to child pornography and abuse content located outside of the nation operating the filtering system.

== Implementations ==
=== United Kingdom ===
Cleanfeed is a content blocking system technology implemented in the UK by BT, Britain's largest Internet provider as the first to block the Internet Watch Foundation's child abuse image content list. It was created in 2003 and went live in June 2004.

=== Canada ===
Cleanfeed in Canada is a voluntary Internet URL filtering list maintained by Cybertip.ca for use by participating ISPs. Eight major providers, representing approximately 80% of Canada's Internet users, have been using the list since November 2006 to block foreign websites.

== Proposed implementations ==
=== Australia ===
Cleanfeed in Australia was a proposed mandatory ISP level content filtration system. It was proposed by the Kim Beazley led Australian Labor Party opposition in a 2006 press release, with the intention of protecting children who were vulnerable to claimed parental computer illiteracy. It was announced on 31 December 2007 as a policy to be implemented by the Rudd ALP government, and initial tests in Tasmania produced a report in 2008. Public opposition and criticism quickly emerged, led by the EFA and gaining irregular mainstream media attention, with a majority of Australians reportedly "strongly against" its implementation. Criticisms included expense, inaccuracy (it will be impossible to ensure only illegal sites are blocked) and the fact that it will be compulsory. Cleanfeed was quietly abandoned as a policy after the 2010 election.

== See also ==
- Content-control software
- Golden Shield Project
- Internet censorship
- Internet censorship in Australia
- Censorship in Canada
- Internet censorship in the United Kingdom
- List of websites blocked in the United Kingdom
- Virgin Killer § Wikipedia controversy
