= FilesTube =

Defunct metasearch engine

- Website type: Metasearch engine
- Available in: Chinese, English, French, German, Polish, Russian, Spanish
- Owner: Red-Sky Sp. z.o.o.
- Website: filestube.com
- Launched: June 2007
- Current status: Offline

FilesTube was a metasearch engine established in 2007, which specialized in searching files in various file sharing and uploading services, such as Mega. It also included sections for videos, games, lyrics and software.

In December 2014, FilesTube discontinued its file-search service and became a free service for streaming licensed independent movies and series. As of July 2016, site redirects to viewster.com, site providing access to limited number of licensed content, including Anime and movies.

It is owned by Polish company Red-Sky.

== Name and logo ==
The old logo of FilesTube, showing a very close resemblance to YouTube's logo.

The name and logo of the website are in the style of the video-sharing website YouTube. While the old logo looked almost identical to the YouTube logo (with "Files" replacing "You" and the logo colour being blue), slight changes have been made to the current logo.

== Reception ==
In 2010, Donnie Jenkins of Chattanooga Times Free Press called the website "a dedicated search site to find downloadable files such as audio, video and documents".

== Copyright infringement and blocking ==
While it operated as a search engine, FilesTube said it removed copyrighted content from its search results on request. However, it was blocked by court order or government action in several countries:

- Malaysia in June 2011 (no longer blocked as of May 2014)
- The United Kingdom in October 2013
- Turkey in January 2010
