= Newzbin =

Former British Usenet indexing website

- Newzbin logo

- Screenshot of main page
- Available in: English
- Founded: 2002
- Dissolved: 2012
- Founders: Chris Elsworth, Thomas Hurst, Lee Skillen
- Website: (formerly newzbin.com)
- Current status: Inactive, closed down on 28 November 2012

Newzbin was a British Usenet indexing website, intended to facilitate access to content on Usenet. The site caused controversy over its stance on copyrighted material. Access to the Newzbin.com website was blocked by BT and Sky in late 2011, following legal action in the UK by Hollywood film studios. The website was launched in 2002, and then later incorporated as a limited company in 2004 by founders Chris Elsworth, Thomas Hurst and Lee Skillen.

The site announced that it had closed down on 28 November 2012.

== Features ==
Newzbin indexed binary files that had been posted on Usenet, and offered the results through a search engine, with categories that included "Movies", "Music", "Apps" and "Books". The site created NZB files, which allowed the files to be downloaded with a suitable newsreader. NZB files are similar to torrent files, as they do not contain the file itself, but information about the location of the file to be downloaded. The search results could be browsed free of charge after creating a user account, but access to the NZB files was restricted to premium members who paid a subscription.

== 2010 legal action from Hollywood studios ==
In February and March 2010, Twentieth Century Fox Film Corporation, Universal City Studios Productions LLLP, Warner Bros. Entertainment Inc., Paramount Pictures Corporation, Disney Enterprises, Inc. and Columbia Pictures Industries, Inc. took joint legal action against Newzbin in the High Court in London, arguing that the site was encouraging widespread copyright infringement by indexing unofficial copies of films on Usenet.

In March 2010, Mr. Justice Kitchin ruled that Newzbin was deliberately indexing copyrighted content, observing that Newzbin had a "sophisticated and substantial infrastructure and in the region of 700,000 members, though not all premium", and that "for the year ended 31 December 2009, it had a turnover in excess of £1million, a profit in excess of £360,000 and paid dividends on ordinary shares of £415,000". Chris Elsworth, the main operator of Newzbin, had said repeatedly during the case that he had no knowledge of infringement occurring on the service, and that Newzbin's categories for "CAM," "screener," "telesync," "DVD", "R5 retail", "Blu-ray," and "HD DVD" did not suggest any evidence of infringement. Kitchin was critical of Elsworth, stating that his evidence disputing the claim that the site's features did not encourage copyright infringement was "simply not credible".

On 18 May 2010, the Newzbin.com site was temporarily shut down, displaying the message "Regrettably the Newzbin website has to close as a result of the legal action against us."

By 2 June 2010, Newzbin was back online, under the name Newzbin2, but using the same code and database as its predecessor, and hosted in the Seychelles.

== 2011 legal action and ISP site blocking ==
In June 2011, the Motion Picture Association applied for an injunction to force BT, the largest Internet service provider in the United Kingdom, to cut off customers' access to Newzbin. On 28 July 2011, the High Court ruled that BT had to block access to Newzbin, using Cleanfeed. BT announced that it would not appeal against the ruling. The Open Rights Group was critical of the decision, saying that it could set a "dangerous" precedent.

In September 2011, Newzbin released client software which aimed to circumvent the BT blocking.

On 26 October 2011 at the High Court, Mr. Justice Arnold ordered BT to block its estimated six million customers' access to the website Newzbin2 within fourteen days, the first ruling of its kind under UK copyright law. Attempts to access the site from a BT IP address were met by the message "Error – site blocked". Newzbin claimed that the block was ineffective, and that 93.5% of its active UK users had downloaded its workaround software. A study suggested that the workaround involved encryption to hide communication between users and Newzbin2, including the use of the Tor network.

Sky blocked access to Newzbin, stating: "We have received a court order requiring us to block access to this illegal website, which we did on 13th December, 2011."

== 2012 ==
On 26 January 2012, barrister David Harris, who had represented Newzbin during part of the 2010 High Court case, was disbarred after it emerged that 100% of the site's issued share capital was held in his name. He was also fined £2,500 after tweeting as "@Geeklawyer", describing opposing lawyers with the words "slimebags" and "prick".

In February 2012, the Newzbin.com domain closed down, and the site moved to Newzbin2.es.

On 13 August 2012, Virgin Media blocked access to the site.

=== Closedown ===
On 28 November 2012, Newzbin2.es announced the closure of its indexing service, displaying to visitors the following text on its main page:

It is with regret that we announce the closure of Newzbin2.

A combination of several factors has made this the only option. For a long time we have struggled with poor indexing of Usenet, poor numbers of reports caused by the majority of our editors dropping out & no-one replacing them. Our servers have been unstable and crashing on a regular basis meaning the NZBs & NFOs are unavailable for long periods and we don't have the money to replace them.

Newzbin2 was always hoped to be a viable underground commercial venture. The figures just don't stack up. Newzbin1 was said to have had 700,000 registered users. In fact that was the total number of people who ever signed up in the history of Newzbin from 2000 onwards & only a fraction were active, loads of people dropped out & went to other sites. We reckon they had about 100,000 users and of those only a few 10's of thousands paid premium topups.That still made good money for the Newzbin1 guys. We never quite got the trust and lots of people said "Newzbin2 is an MPA trap", that stung us bad and we never got the userbase back. We don't have much more than about 40000 active users and the number of premium users is in the small thousands. It costs much more to run than we bring in, It just doesn't stack up.

To make things worse all our payment providers dropped out or started running scared. The MPA sued PayPal and are going at our innocent payment provider Kthxbai Ltd in the UK. Our other payment provider has understandably lost their nerve. Result? We have no more payment providers to offer & no realistic means of taking money (no, Bitcoin isn't credible as it's just too hard for 90% of people).

The tragedy is this: unlike Newzbin1 we are 100% DMCA compliant. We have acted on every DMCA notice we received without stalling or playing games: if there was a DMCA complaint the report was gone. Period. That was a condition of our advertising & payment partners so we complied but we never got a single complaint from the MPA. Not one.

Will we be back? not as a search service but we might run a blog from this site at some point.

=== December 2012 court action against former Newzbin directors ===
On 20 December 2012 at the High Court in London, Mr Justice Newey ruled that the film studios involved in the legal action against Newzbin did not have a proprietary claim to money derived from infringement of copyright. The studios had taken action against David Harris and Chris Elsworth, two of the former directors of the company.

== See also ==
- Comparison of Usenet newsreaders
- Digital Economy Act 2010
- Grokster
