= Public estate in the United Kingdom =

Government owned property in the United Kingdom

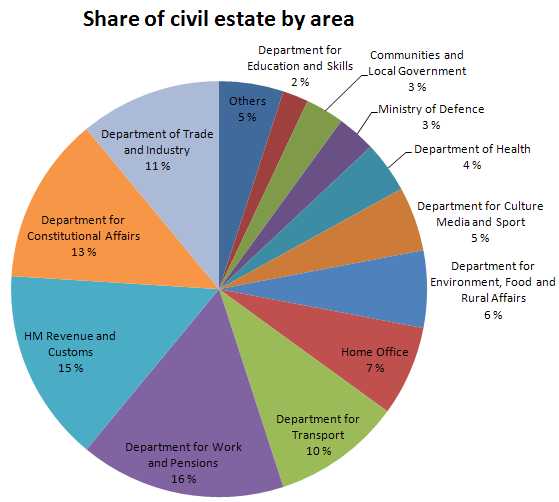
Distribution of the United Kingdom government's real estate among the government departmental groups

The public estate in the United Kingdom is the collection of all government-owned real property assets in the United Kingdom. The Office for National Statistics estimated in 2008 that the public estate has a book value of £380 billion, which is about £6,000 for every UK resident. Of this, approximately £240 billion is held by local government, while the rest—£130 billion—is held by the central government and public corporations.

In 2007, the Office of Government Commerce estimated that the government's office portfolio was worth £30 billion, and cost £6 billion annually to run.

In the mid-1990s, government real estate management functions were passed from the Property Services Agency to individual departments. The National Audit Office stated in 2006 that the motive behind this change was that it brought greater clarity and accountability, although it also diminished economies of scale and synergies between departments. The Property Services Agency was succeeded by Property Holdings, which in 1996, was succeeded by the Property Advisors to the Civil Estate.

The Office of Government Commerce (OGC) has no authority to direct other government departments. Rather, it issues guidelines and has an advisory role.

Central government bodies adhere to the Civil Estate Co-ordination Protocol (CECP).

Government departments are accountable for managing and using their own property portfolio.
