= Timeline of file sharing =

== 1970s ==
- 1976 – XMODEM a point-to-point binary transfer protocol by Ward Christensen.
- February 1978 – Ward Christensen's CBBS becomes the first Bulletin board system. BBS access is limited to phone lines until the early 1990s.
- 1979 – Usenet conceived by Tom Truscott and Jim Ellis at the University of North Carolina at Chapel Hill and Duke University. Its primary purpose is to facilitate focused discussion threads within topical categories (Usenet newsgroups), but it also allows the transfer of files. As of 2021 alt.binaries.* newsgroups continue to serve files.

== 1980s ==
Most file sharing in this era was done by modem over landline telephone, at speeds from 300 to 9600 bits per second. Many file systems in use only supported short filenames. Computer memory and speed was very limited, with 33 MHz CPUs only being accessible to consumers at the end of the decade.

- 1981 – Kermit (protocol) – a binary protocol that can be used with telnet or other BBS systems to transfer binary data.
- January 1984 – In Sony Corp. of America v. Universal City Studios, Inc., the Supreme Court of the United States finds that making individual copies of complete television shows for purposes of time-shifting is fair use. This case would create some interpretative challenges to courts in applying the case to more recent file sharing technologies available for use on home computers and over the Internet.
- 1984 – Fidonet, an inter-BBS protocol that became widely available, is founded by Tom Jennings.
- October 1985 – File Transfer Protocol is standardized in RFC 959, authored by Postel and Reynolds, which made the preceding RFC 765 (and earlier FTP RFCs back to the original RFC 114) obsolete. FTP allows files to be efficiently uploaded and downloaded from a central server.
- 1985 – Ymodem – a minor improvement to Xmodem.
- 1986 – Zmodem – another point-to-point binary transfer protocol, which had superior long-distance (high latency) transmission.
- August 1988 – Internet Relay Chat is created by Jarkko Oikarinen.

== 1990s ==
FTP, IRC and Usenet were the main vehicles for file sharing in this decade. Data compression technologies for audio and video (like MP3, AAC and MPEG) came into use towards the end of the 1990s. Copper wire was common with fibre optic cable only becoming available late in the decade.

- 1990 – Michael Sandrof adds Client-to-client protocol functionality to IRC client ircII allowing users to share files.
- November 1990 – The World Wide Web is formally proposed by Tim Berners-Lee and Robert Cailliau.
- December 1991 – The Moving Picture Experts Group chooses an audio codec developed by Karlheinz Brandenburg and his colleagues at Fraunhofer Society with input from AT&T and Thomson to serve as the MPEG-1 Audio Layer 3 (MP3) ISO/IEC standard. This allows songs on CDs to be converted into small computer files.
- June 1992 – RFC 1341 establishes the Multipurpose Internet Mail Extensions(MIME) standards for sending audio and images by email, paving the way for the alt.binaries hierarchy on Usenet.
- 1992 – Software Publishers Association runs an anti-copyright infringement campaign Don't Copy That Floppy
- July 1994 – The Fraunhofer Society released the l3enc mp3 encoding software as shareware, the first of its kind.
- September 1995 – The Fraunhofer Society released WinPlay3, the first software mp3 player for Windows.
- June 1996 – Mp3 warez group Rabid Neurosis founded. Using connections inside record companies, they rip pre-release music CDs, and make the mp3's available for others to download. Mirabilis developed ICQ, a chat client for Windows that can do file transfers up to 2 GBs.
- 1997 – Scour Inc. is founded by five UCLA Computer Science students. Early products provide file search and download using the SMB protocol, as well as a multimedia web search engine released in 1998. Scour attracted early attention and support from media industry insiders before declaring bankruptcy in October 2000.
- April 1997 – Winamp audio player is released, including the ability to make playlists, leading to increased use of MP3 files.
- May 1997 – AOL launches AOL Instant Messenger with file transfer capabilities.
- August 1997 – Hotline is announced at MacWorld, and allows chat, forums, and file transfers. It becomes popular among Mac users.
- September 1997 – Windows Media Player 6.1 includes support for mp3 playback for the first time.
- November 1997 –
  MP3.com is founded by Michael Robertson and Greg Flores. Initially an FTP search engine, MP3.com becomes a hosting service for unsigned artists. It serves 4 million audio file downloads per day at its peak and becomes the largest technology IPO in July 1999. The release of My.MP3.com in January 2000, which allowed users to stream their own files, would prompt litigation. In May 2000, UMG v. MP3.com would be ruled in favor of the record labels. MP3.com would settle for $200 million and discontinue the service.
- January 1998 – Musicmatch Jukebox is released providing easier to use CD-ripping software for creating mp3's on Windows.
- March 1998 – The MPMan F10, the first portable MP3 player, is launched.
- July 1998 – SoundJam MP released allowing mp3 playback and CD-ripping on Macintosh computers. In 2000, Apple bought this program, and used it as the basis for iTunes.
- September 1998 – Rio PMP300 MP3 player is shipped by Diamond Multimedia. Its popularity leads the RIAA to file a temporary restraining order in October, without success.
- October 1998 – Digital Millennium Copyright Act is unanimously passed by the US Senate. DMCA provides a 'safe harbor' ensuring that Internet Service Providers cannot be sued for the activities of their users.
- November 1998 – Audiogalaxy is created by Michael Merhej. Initially an FTP search engine, the Audiogalaxy Satellite P2P client would reach 1 million downloads in 2001. In May 2002, a suit by the RIAA would force Audiogalaxy to block sharing of illegal songs. In June 2002, Audiogalaxy would settle the suit for an undisclosed amount and make its services opt-in. In September 2002, Audiogalaxy would discontinue P2P services in favor of Rhapsody, a pay streaming service.
- December 1998 – MP3 Newswire, the first digital media news site, is launched.
- February 1999 – China's Tencent launches QQ, a chat client with file transfer capability.
- June 1999 – Napster was created by Shawn Fanning. Napster let users search across all users' shares. Napster provided a centralized server that indexed the files, and carried out the searches. Individual files, however, remain on the hosts' computers and were transferred directly from peer to peer.
- November 1999 - The Direct Connect network is created.
- November 1999 – iMesh is launched.
- December 1999 – The first lawsuits were filed against Napster.

== 2000s ==
In computer science terms, modern file sharing begins in the 2000s. Several file sharing protocols and file formats were introduced, along with nearly a decade in protocol experimentation. Towards the end of the 2000s, BitTorrent became subject to a "man in the middle" attack in TCP mode – and this has led most file sharing protocols to move to UDP towards the very end of the decade. Client and tracker software in this era was in development as much as the transmission protocols, so the file trading software was not always as reliable as it could have been.

=== 2000 ===
- January – My.MP3.com is released by MP3.com.
- March – Scour Exchange is released as a P2P file exchange service to compete with Napster. In addition to audio files, it also supports sharing of other media as well as software.
- March – Gnutella becomes the first decentralized file sharing network with the release of a network client by Justin Frankel and Tom Pepper of Nullsoft. Like Napster, users could share large numbers of files at once, and search across the entire network for files.
- March – Phex (formerly FURI) Gnutella client released.
- May – UMG v. MP3.com causes My.MP3.com to shut down. MSN Messenger 3.0 becomes the first version to include file transfer capability.
- June – Slyck.com (originally Slyway.com) launches.
- July –
  Freenet is created by Ian Clarke. Its goal is to provide freedom of speech through a peer-to-peer network which focuses on protecting anonymity. Files are distributed across the computers of Freenet's users. Ian Clarke's paper would become the most-cited computer science paper of 2000. Freenet would become a darknet in 2008.
- September – eDonkey2000 client and server software is released by Jed McCaleb, introducing hashing into decentralized file sharing.
- October – Scour Exchange is shut down as Scour Inc. files for bankruptcy in the face of copyright infringement litigation.
- October – Napster is credited with driving Radiohead's Kid A album to the top of the Billboard charts.
- December – Peer-to-peer file sharing client WinMX 1.8 beta is released, providing users with another way to connect to Napster (later OpenNap) networks.
- December – Bearshare was launched as a Gnutella-based peer-to-peer file sharing application.

=== 2001 ===
- February – A&M Records, Inc. v. Napster, Inc.
- February – Napster peaks at 26.4 million users.
- March – Kazaa and the FastTrack proprietary protocol are released by Niklas Zennström, Janus Friis, and Priit Kasesalu. The Kazaa Media Desktop client came bundled with malware. Legal action in the Netherlands would force an offshoring of the company, renamed Sharman Networks. In September 2003, the RIAA would file suit against private individuals allegedly sharing files via Kazaa. In September 2005, UMA v. Sharman would be ruled against Sharman by the Federal Court of Australia. Sharman's non-compliance would prompt censorship of the program in Australia. In July 2006, the MGM Studios, Inc. v. Grokster, Ltd. would cause Sharman to settle for $100 million and convert Kazaa to a legal-only file sharing program.
- April – Morpheus is released by MusicCity (later StreamCast), after licensing the FastTrack protocol. MusicCity had previously operated OpenNap servers. Morpheus would become a popular FastTrack client, with 4.5 million users, until licensing disputes and a protocol switch in February 2002. In March 2003, the Morpheus client was re-released to operate on Gnutella, using Gnucleus servant as its core. In June 2005, a redesigned Morpheus client would be released. In June 2005, MGM Studios, Inc. v. Grokster, Ltd. would be decided against StreamCast. In June 2008, the Morpheus client would become no longer available for download.
- April – gtk-gnutella client is released.
- July – Napster shuts down due to injunction. Many former Napster users move to OpenNap servers.
- July – Audiogalaxy Satellite client reaches 1 million downloads.
- July 2 – BitTorrent released by Bram Cohen. Users only upload one or a small number of files at a time, but all peers are forced to seed to other peers from the parts of a file they have received so far. Initially, programs did not include a search function, so indexing sites sprung up. Downloads for popular files tend to be faster than on many other networks.
- August – ShareReactor eDonkey network index site founded. It would be taken down by police in March 2004.
- September – Sony Music Entertainment admitted that they had included digital rights management software on Michael Jackson's You Rock My World single, perhaps the first such scheme to be implemented.
- October – Mutella client is released. By 2007, it would no longer be functional.
- October – Apple released the first iPod, which would eventually become the most popular portable mp3 player.
- October – Windows Media Player 8 includes the ability to rip CDs to mp3 for the first time.
- October 2 – The MPAA and the RIAA file a lawsuit against the developers of Kazaa, Morpheus and Grokster that would lead to the US Supreme Court's MGM Studios, Inc. v. Grokster, Ltd. decision in 2005.
- November – GNUnet is first publicly announced.
- November – DC++ is created for the Direct Connect network and would become the most popular client.

=== 2002 ===
- January – JASRAC and RIAJ vs Michihito Matsuda and Yugen Kaisha Nippon MMO in Tokyo district court, causing File rogue(ファイルローグ) ordered to shut down on April 9.
- February – The Kazaa protocol switch shuts out Morpheus.
- May – eMule is released and soon becomes the eDonkey2000 network's most popular client
- May – Audiogalaxy takes steps to block illegal files due to RIAA lawsuit.
- May 27 – RapidShare one-click hosting service was founded by Christian Schmid.
- June – Audiogalaxy settles RIAA suit for undisclosed amount, its file sharing becomes limited.
- June – First release of Shareaza by Michael Stokes.
- June – Applejuice released.
- July – Overnet introduced by the creators of eDonkey2000 implementing the Kademlia algorithm.
- July – Soribada (소리바다) was closed on July 11 by Suwon District Court South Division.
- August – P2Pnet is founded by Jon Newton. Apple releases OS X 10.2 including the iChat client which includes file transfer capabilities.
- September – Audiogalaxy discontinues P2P services.
- September – Tor was released.
- October – Soulseek file sharing program released.
- October – Suprnova.org torrent index goes online.
- November – Gnutella2 protocol is announced.

=== 2003 ===
- January – isoHunt torrent index founded by Gary Fung. As of 2008, it serves over 40 million unique searches per month.
- March – The Open Music Model is published, advocating a business model for the recording industry based on file sharing
- April – Demonoid torrent index founded. As of 2008, it is the second-largest public torrent tracker in the world.
- May – Poisoned is released. It is the first Kazaa client for the Mac OS X platform.
- May – The iTunes Music Store is launched by Apple, selling music by individual tracks, with digital rights management to prevent file sharing
- May 15 – First hearing before House Committee of Government Reform on inadvertent file sharing, Overexposed: The Threats to Privacy & Security on File Sharing Networks. Inadvertent File Sharing was a security concern detailed by researcher Nathaniel Good at HP Labs describing how user interface issues contributed to users of KaZaA inadvertently sharing personal and confidential information over p2p networks.
- June 17 – Second congressional hearing before Senate Judiciary Committee on inadvertent file sharing The Dark Side of a Bright Idea: Could Personal and National Security Risks Compromise the Potential of P2P File-Sharing Networks?
- July – Torrentse and Sharelive sites both shut down as a result of the MPAA starting to take action against BitTorrent sites.
- September – TorrentSpy is registered. It would be shut down in March 2008, and in May 2008 it would be ordered to pay the MPAA $110 million in damages.
- September 8 – The RIAA begins filing lawsuits against individuals allegedly sharing files on P2P networks such as Kazaa.
- November – Winny source code is confiscated by the Kyoto Police
- November 21 – The Pirate Bay (TPB) bittorrent tracker is founded by Gottfrid Svartholm, Fredrik Neij, and Peter Sunde. It is based in Sweden. It has remained active despite numerous legal actions and a police raid in May 2006. As of February 4, 2013, it is the 73rd most popular site on the Internet according to Alexa.
- 2003 – eMule introduces the Kad network, which implements the Kademlia protocol. Invisible Internet Project (i2p) is launched to provide an anonymizing layer for p2p programs.

=== 2004 ===
- January 17 – The initial version of the Advanced Direct Connect protocol is introduced for the Direct Connect network.
- March 10 – ShareReactor shut down by Swiss Police.
- May 10 – Winny developer Isamu Kaneko is arrested for suspected conspiracy to commit copyright violation.
- June 1 – Shareaza becomes open source with the release of v2.0 of the software. As of 2008, almost all of the major clients on its supported networks (gnutella, Gnutella2, eDonkey) are open source.
- October 28 – The RIAA files an additional 750 lawsuits aimed at alleged copyright violations from file sharing.
- December 14 – Suprnova and many other torrent indexes closed after cease and desist orders by MPAA.
- December 14 – LokiTorrent refuses to comply with cease and desist orders, quickly gains 680,000 users, and $40,000 in legal fund donations. Its legitimacy would later be questioned and it would be taken over by MPAA in February 2005.
- December 15 – US Federal Trade Commission Peer-to-Peer File-Sharing Workshop entitled Peer-to-Peer File-Sharing Technology: Consumer Protection and Competition Issues

=== 2005 ===
- January – Mininova torrent index goes online as a successor to Suprnova. It has served 5 billion downloads as of May 2008.
- January – eXeem goes online and rumored/adversed as "the revenge of suprnova". The program failed to gain popularity and was eventually abandoned months later.
- February – LokiTorrent indexing service shut down and is taken over by MPAA. YouTube comes online.
- March – WinMX reported as the most popular music service with 2.1 million users followed by iTunes and LimeWire with 1.7 million users each.
- March – Avalanche BitTorrent alternative proposed. Is criticized by BitTorrent creator Bram Cohen.
- March 21 – Megaupload one-click hosting service is launched.
- May – TV show torrent tracker/search engine eztvefnet.org is launched.
- June – A redesigned Morpheus client would be released.
- June – A busy CD music MP3 download site Boxup closed down and membership transfer to coxoo, then discontinued 2006/03.
- June – Grokster developers are found guilty by the United States Supreme court of encouraging copyright infringement
- June 30 – EzPeer wins its case vs IFPI Taiwan in Shilin district court. The high court would later reject an appeal, but ezPeer would settle with IPFI Taiwan. As of 2008, it is a legal music download service.
- August – Yahoo! Messenger adds drag and drop file sharing capability with version 7.
- September 5 – UMA v. Sharman
- September 13 – WinMX servers owned by Frontcode are shut down due to a cease and desist letter from the RIAA. Developer groups would set up new servers days later.
- September 9 – Kuro (酷樂) loses its case vs IFPI Taiwan in Taipei local court. It would also lose its case vs Push Sound Music & Entertainment on December 19, 2006. Kuro would lose its appeal in the Taiwan high court on July 16, 2008. Chairman Chen Shou-ten (陳壽騰), CEO James Chen (陳國華), president Chen Kuo-hsiung (陳國雄), and one of Kuro's 500,000 members Chen Chia-hui (陳佳惠), were sentenced to fine and jail. It shut down its P2P services in 2006, and has become a legal music download service.
- September 28 – MetaMachine Inc. discontinues the development and maintenance of the original eDonkey2000 client and of the Overnet network following a cease and desist letter from the RIAA.
- October – Programmer Mark Russinovich revealed on his blog that Sony Music Entertainment had started shipping music CD's that surreptitiously install a rootkit on Windows PCs designed to prevent copying. Developers at Delft University of Technology and VU University Amsterdam release Tribler, a Bittorrent client which tries to provide anonymity for seeders and downloaders.
- November – Bram Cohen, the author of the peer-to-peer (P2P) BitTorrent protocol and the BitTorrent program, made a deal with the MPAA to remove links to illegal content on the official BitTorrent website. The deal was with the seven largest studios in America. The agreement means the site will comply with procedures outlined in the Digital Millennium Copyright Act.
- November 12 – TorrentFreak is launched.

=== 2006 ===
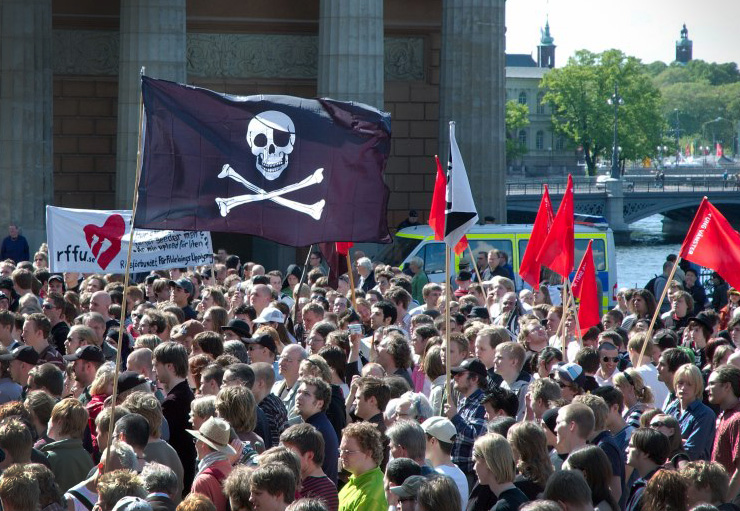
Pro-file sharing demonstration in Sweden after the police raid against The Pirate Bay, 2006

- February 21 – Razorback2, a Swiss indexing server and one of the biggest on the eDonkey network, is raided and taken down.
- May 31 – The servers of the Swedish website The Pirate Bay are raided by 50 Swedish police officers, causing it to go offline for three days.
- June, July – AT&T and Comcast stop offering Newsgroups. Sprint, Time Warner Cable and Verizon drop the alt.* or alt.binaries.* hierarchy.
- August 21 – "Weird Al" Yankovic releases "Don't Download This Song" exclusively as a digital download via MySpace and YouTube lampooning several events in the music filesharing history to this point.
- October – YouTube announced the introduction of a "content identification architecture" which allows them to locate videos under copyright, and remove them. If copyright holders choose to leave the video up, YouTube agrees to pay them a share of the advertising revenue. Universal Music Group, Sony Music Entertainment and Warner Music Group all agree to this approach. MediaFire, file host, is launched.
- 2006 – Anonymous friend-to-friend client Retroshare is first released.

=== 2007 ===
- EMI gave up using digital rights management on their audio CD's, the last music company to do so.
- August 9 – Microsoft launches Windows Live SkyDrive in the United Kingdom and India. They gradually made it available in more countries, and in January 2014, the service was renamed OneDrive.
- August 21 – Suprnova.org is relaunched by The Pirate Bay.
- September – Amazon.com begins selling mp3's free of digital rights management.
- October 12 – RIAA files a lawsuit against Usenet.com, accusing it of being an illicit peer-to-peer file sharing site.
- October 23 – OiNK's Pink Palace BitTorrent Tracker is raided and shut down by a joint effort between Dutch and British police.
- October 24 – The civil-court jury trial for Capitol v. Thomas, the first lawsuit by major record labels against an alleged file sharer, concludes with a verdict for the plaintiffs and a statutory damage award of $9,250 for each of 24 songs, for a total of $220,000. This was vacated due to an error in jury instruction, and a new trial was held in 2009.
- November 9 – The Demonoid BitTorrent tracker shuts down until April 2008 citing legal threats by the CRIA.
- December 20 – Shareaza.com, the homepage of Shareaza, is taken over by Discordia Ltd., a company closely related to the RIAA (Recording Industry Association of America). It now distributes software containing spyware and adware.

=== 2008 ===
- Sony BMG opens up their music catalog for sale over internet DRM-free, the last music company to allow this.
- January 10 – A trademark claiming the name Shareaza is filled by Discordia Ltd.
- March 24 – TorrentSpy shuts down citing hostile legal climate.
- April 11 – Demonoid comes back online.
- May 7 – TorrentSpy is ordered to pay $110 million in damages by US court.
- May 8 – Freenet darknet rewrite is released.
- August 8 – Italy prevents their citizens from accessing The Pirate Bay and forwards their traffic to IFPI instead.
- September – Dropbox launches to the public.
- October 10 – An appeal by The Pirate Bay's lawyers succeeds in lifting the Italian ban.
- October 29 – Morpheus website taken down; client is no longer available.
- November 27 – A Danish court rules that ISPs must block access to the website The Pirate Bay.
- December 16 – ShareReactor is reopened by The Pirate Bay.
- December 19 – The RIAA claims to have ended its P2P litigation campaign against individuals in the U.S., which had been losing money, in favor of a three strikes campaign. However, some new lawsuits continued to be filed.

=== 2009 ===
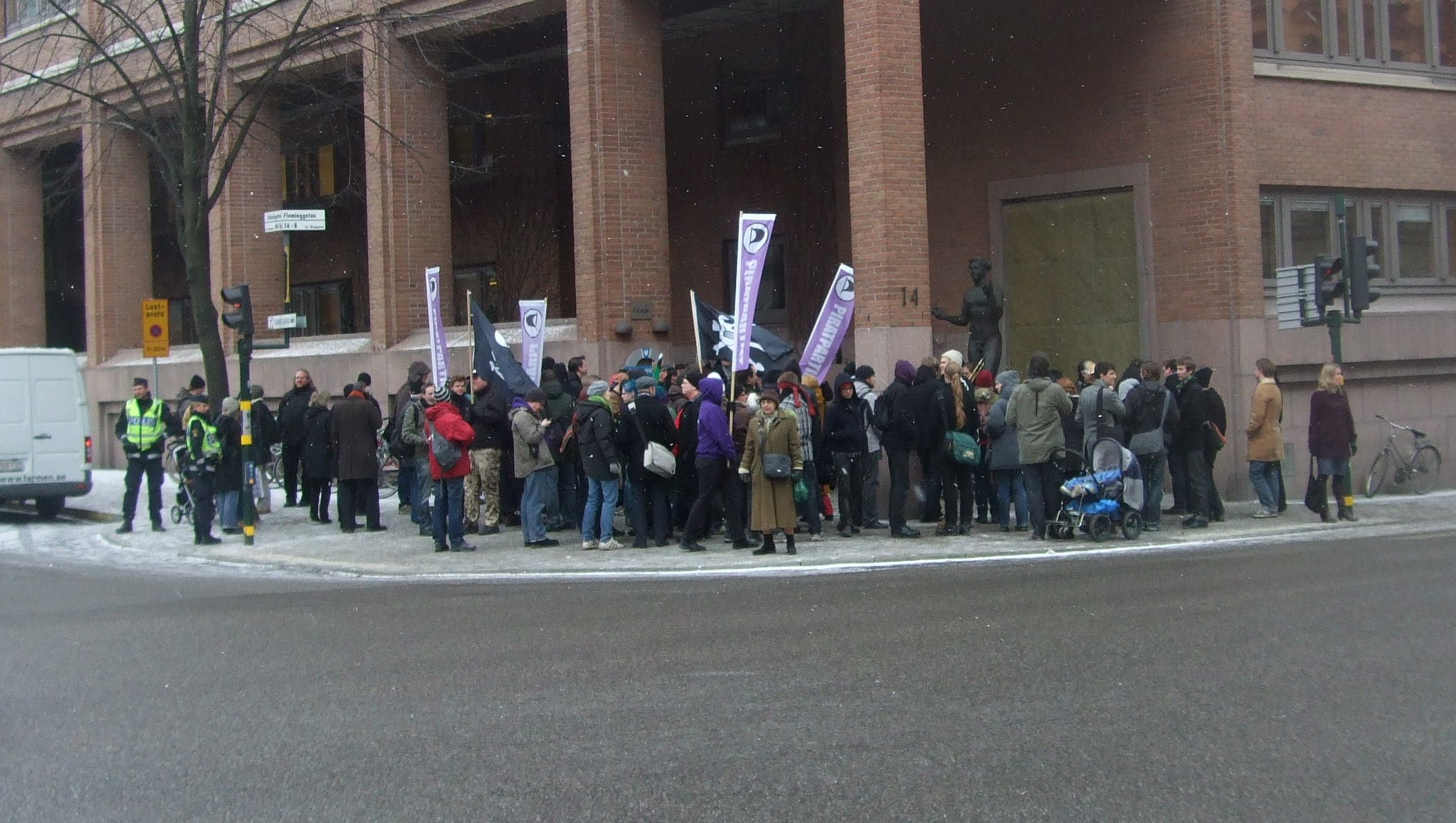
Protestors demonstrating against The Pirate Bay trial on February 16, 2009

- January – Apple's iTunes Store began offering all of its digital tracks free from Digital rights management.
- February 16 – The Pirate Bay trial starts.
- February 23 – OneSwarm is released.
- April 17 – The Pirate Bay trial concludes with a guilty verdict; each defendant is sentenced to one year in jail and a total of 30 million SEK (US$3.6 million, 2.7 million EUR) in fines and damages. The people behind The Pirate Bay declare they will appeal the ruling.
- April 24 – Legal fees in record industry lawsuits cause SeeqPod to sell its technology; the site closes until it finds a buyer.
- June 15 – In the retrial of the 2007 Capitol v. Thomas case, a jury again finds in favor of the plaintiffs, and awards statutory damages of $80,000 per song, for a total of $1.92 million.
- June 30 – Swedish gaming company Global Gaming Factory says it has an interest in purchasing The Pirate Bay. Global Gaming factory eventually lose funding to do so. (GGF).
- September 9 – Six alleged members of the mp3 warez group Rabid Neurosis were indicted on charges of conspiracy to commit copyright infringement. Two were acquitted. Four pleaded guilty, and served 3-month prison sentences.
- September 14 – Demonoid experiences hardware damage from power outages causing a three-month downtime.
- September 30 – Global Gaming Factory fails to produce the funds to purchase The Pirate Bay and the deal is put to an end.
- November 26 – Mininova has removed torrents to all copyrighted content that it does not have official agreements for.
- December – BtChina and about 530 other sites registered in China were closed down.
- December 13 – Demonoid is back online.

== 2010s ==
In computer science terms, there have been few significant developments in the 2010s. The BitTorrent protocol and clients have become more stable, adopting UDP to defend against transmission problems related to TCP. IPv6 support increased with clients and trackers.

=== 2010 ===
- October 26, 2010 – US federal court judge Kimba Wood issued an injunction forcing LimeWire to prevent "the searching, downloading, uploading, file trading and/or file distribution functionality, and/or all functionality" of its software (see Arista Records LLC v. Lime Group LLC). As a result, LimeWire May 5, 2011 and newer have been disabled using a backdoor installed by the company.
- November 9, 2010 – First release of a modified version of LimeWire Pro with all undesirable components removed (such as ad- and spyware, as well as dependencies to LimeWire LLC servers) under the name of "LimeWire Pirate Edition", enabling access to all advanced features of the professional version for free.
- November 26, 2010 – The verdict in The Pirate Bay trial was announced. The appeal court shortened sentences of three of the defendants who appeared in court that day. Neij's sentence was reduced to 10 months, Sunde's to eight, and Lundström's to four. However, the fine was increased from 32 to 46 million kronor.

=== 2011 ===
- March 2011 – A case involving LimeWire is announced, with an attempt to sue the company for up to $75 trillion.
- June 2011 – Malaysia government blocked 10 file sharing sites.
- October 2011 – Foxy (P2P) shut down. British Telecom received a court order to block access to Newzbin2.

=== 2012 ===
- January 2012 – The office of EX.UA was raided and service shut down. It was restored in February.
- February 2012 – The domain names of the popular one-click hosting service Megaupload were seized and the site was shut down by the United States Department of Justice, following the indictment and arrests of the owners for allegedly operating as an organization dedicated to copyright infringement.
- February 2012 – FileServe and Filesonic, both popular file sharing sites voluntarily stop all sharing services, while another site, uploaded.to, begins blocking all IP addresses from the U.S.
- February 2012 – Btjunkie, one of the most popular BitTorrent sites voluntarily shuts down.
- April 2012 – Google launches its Google Drive service.
- June 2012 – FDzone in Hong Kong and Macau was shut down.
- August 2012 – Seized Demonoid BitTorrent sites up for sale. Filesonic, which previously disabled its sharing services following Megaupload's shutdown, goes completely offline.
- September 2012 – The file sharing site uploaded.to switches its domain to uploaded.net; in addition, it starts allowing IP addresses from the U.S.

=== 2013 ===
- January 2013 – Mega, the successor to Megaupload, was launched from New Zealand.
- October 2013 – As part of a settlement with the MPAA, Gary Fung shuts down Torrent index site Isohunt, but mirrors soon pop up.
- December 2013 – Hotfile shuts down following a settlement made with the Motion Picture Association of America.

=== 2014 ===
- May 2014 – Infinit launched its Windows app (Public Beta).
- November 2014 – Tencent, the Chinese internet company behind QQ and WeChat sued Netease for streaming 623 songs it claims it held exclusive licenses for. At the time, Netease was offering a Grooveshark-like free music service.
- December 2014 – IsoHunt release the source code for Pirate Bay allowing anyone to deploy their own version of The Pirate Bay.

=== 2015 ===
- January 2015 – Launch of anonymous P2P network ZeroNet, which relies on TOR for anonymity
- March 2015 – RapidShare – once one of the most famous file hosting services – shuts down.
- April 2015 – Grooveshark, music streaming site, shuts down.
- August 2015 – Video sharing website Openload.co comes online.
- The FBI seize the file sharing site ShareBeast and arrest its administrator, Artur Sargsyan. The Recording Industry Association of America considered it America's most prolific file sharing site.

=== 2016 ===
- July 2016 – The world's largest torrent site KickassTorrents shuts down.
- August 2016 – Torrent meta-search engine Torrentz.eu takes its torrents down, but is soon replaced by torrentz2.eu.
- November 2016 – Private music tracker what.cd shut down.

=== 2017 ===
- May 2017 – ExtraTorrent shuts down permanently. One of the world’s largest torrent indexes closed for good, erasing data and warning users about fakes.
- September 2017 - The Pirate Bay tests in-browser cryptomining (Coinhive). TPB quietly ran a JavaScript miner in visitors’ browsers to monetize traffic, helping kick off the broader cryptojacking wave later covered by mainstream tech press.

=== 2018 ===
- February 2018 - Demonoid returns after long downtime. After being largely inactive since 2017, the long-running BitTorrent tracker re-emerges under new administration before going offline again later that year.
- March 26 2018 - European Court of Justice rules that ISP blocking orders can cover mirror sites (C-320/16 UPC Telekabel Wien v Constantin Film). This decision affirmed that courts may require ISPs to block successor or mirror domains of infringing sites such as The Pirate Bay.
- April 2018 — Google bans cryptocurrency-mining extensions from Chrome Web Store. The policy responded to the Coinhive wave that began with The Pirate Bay’s 2017 experiment, effectively ending browser-based cryptomining distribution through official channels.
- October 2018 — Coinhive announces shutdown of its mining service after anti-mining crackdowns. This closure effectively ends the short-lived trend of browser-based cryptomining on file-sharing and streaming sites.

=== 2019 ===
- April 2019 - European Council adopts the Copyright Directive (2019/790). Following the September 2018 Parliament vote, the final adoption of the directive — particularly Articles 15 and 17 (formerly 11 and 13) — introduces upload-filter and link-licensing requirements across the EU.
- May 2019 – Demonoid founder Deimos reportedly dies. Community moderators confirm the passing of the tracker’s longtime administrator, leading to another period of dormancy for the historic BitTorrent site.
- August 2019 – YTS, LimeTorrents, and other major torrent sites hit by coordinated ISP blocks in the UK. High Court injunctions expand the range of torrent domains subject to mandatory blocking orders.
- December 2019 – RapidVideo shuts down. One of the largest cyberlocker and streaming hosts closes following repeated copyright enforcement and DMCA takedowns.

== 2020s ==
=== 2020 ===
- March 2020 – Global lockdowns during the COVID-19 pandemic lead to record increases in torrent and streaming traffic. Data from multiple ISPs and analytics firms show file-sharing and video piracy activity rising by over 30% in some regions during stay-at-home orders.
- May 2020 - Popcorn Time returns with a new version during pandemic lockdowns. The revived app claims to offer a "Netflix-like" torrent streaming interface, quickly drawing millions of downloads before being targeted again by the MPAA.
- June 2020 – India's Delhi High Court orders blocking of 118 "rogue" domains, including Pirate Bay and YTS mirrors. The injunction, requested by Disney, Warner, and Universal, broadens site-blocking precedents in South Asia.
- September 2020 – U.S. court orders Internet Archive to halt its "National Emergency Library". After lawsuits by major publishers, the Internet Archive closes its temporary digital-lending program launched during COVID-19 closures.
- November 2020 – TorrentGalaxy launches as a successor to ExtraTorrent and 1337x communities. Built by veteran uploaders, the hybrid torrent and streaming index quickly gains traction as one of the few new sites to establish a lasting presence post-2016.

=== 2021 ===
- February 2021 – Z-Library emerges as one of the largest shadow libraries on the web. Following the decline of Library Genesis mirrors, Z-Library expands rapidly, offering over 7 million books and 80 million articles for direct download. Its growth draws international copyright-enforcement attention.
- March 2021 – Google removes popular "piracy-enabling" apps from the Play Store. Apps such as Popcorn Time, TeaTV, and Cinema HD are delisted following MPAA and ACE complaints, marking a new phase of coordinated enforcement against Android streaming clients.
- April 2021 – European Court of Justice rules that hosting providers can be forced to reveal pirate operators’ identities (C-597/19 Mircom v. Telenet). The ruling strengthens rightsholders’ ability to pursue BitTorrent users and mirrors in EU jurisdictions.
- June 2021 – Major torrent proxies and mirror domains seized by ACE and Europol. Dozens of KickassTorrents, 1337x, and RARBG proxy sites are taken offline in coordinated operations announced by the Alliance for Creativity and Entertainment.
- September 2021 – ACE shuts down Nyaa.si clones and Anime torrent mirrors. Targeting anime-focused piracy for the first time, the coalition seizes multiple Nyaa mirror domains used in East Asia and North America.
- November 2021 – RARBG resumes normal operations after prolonged downtime. After weeks of technical issues and speculation about a takedown, RARBG confirms it has restored databases and intends to continue operations.

=== 2022 ===
- March 2022 – Russia legalizes use of unlicensed content from "unfriendly" countries. Following Western sanctions after the invasion of Ukraine, the Russian Ministry of Economic Development proposes allowing domestic companies to use copyrighted works without paying rights-holders from sanctioning nations, effectively enabling state-backed piracy.
- May 2022 – YTS resumes activity under new management despite lawsuits. After settlements in 2020, the YTS.mx domain continues to operate, becoming one of the few major torrent indexes still online, though its legitimacy remains debated.
- July 2022 - Operation 404: Brazilian authorities shut down 226 pirate domains. The anti-piracy operation, coordinated by the Ministry of Justice with international partners, becomes one of the largest crackdowns in Latin America.
- August 2022 – U.S. court orders $82 million judgment against FLVTO.biz and 2Conv stream-ripping sites. The Eastern District of Virginia rules in favor of the RIAA, awarding one of the largest damages in a music-piracy case to date.
- December 2022 – Archive.org and shadow libraries face new coordinated DMCA mass-takedowns. Hundreds of thousands of links to Internet Archive, Z-Library mirrors, and LibGen appear on anti-piracy databases maintained by publishers, signalling a global crackdown on educational file-sharing.

=== 2023 ===
- January 2023 – Z-Library relaunches as a Tor and I2P network. After the 2022 domain seizures, Z-Library re-emerges as a decentralized “shadow library,” accessible only through onion and I2P addresses, with personal domains assigned to registered users.
- March 2023 – ACE shuts down major streaming and torrent domains in coordinated global action. The Alliance for Creativity and Entertainment (ACE) announces the seizure of over 40 domains, including Sdarot, IsraelTV, and Cinehub, marking its largest enforcement campaign to date.
- May 31, 2023 – RARBG shuts down permanently. After more than 15 years online, one of the world’s most visited torrent indexes announces its closure, citing "COVID, war, inflation, and loss of staff." All tracker infrastructure and user data are deleted.
- June 2023 – Russia blocks 1,800 foreign torrent and streaming sites under new Roskomnadzor directive. This wave includes mirrors of The Pirate Bay, RARBG, and Z-Library, marking the country’s largest censorship action against international file-sharing domains.
- September 2023 – U.S. court orders Cloudflare to block DNS access to pirate domains. In a landmark case, a California judge rules that CDN and DNS providers can be compelled to disable access to copyright-infringing sites, expanding intermediary liability.
- October 2023 – Z-Library adds "community upload" features on Tor and I2P. The site introduces anonymous contribution tools, becoming the first major dark-web archive with user-curated metadata and cross-sync between mirrors.
- December 2023 – YouTube-DL reinstated on GitHub after multi-year DMCA controversy. GitHub updates its copyright policy to explicitly protect open-source circumvention tools used for research and archiving, reversing its 2020 takedown stance.

=== 2024 ===
- January 2024 – Z-Library returns to the public web with new clearnet domains. After operating solely through Tor and I2P since 2022, Z-Library re-emerges under new domain names, claiming "improved legal compliance" and mirror redundancy. The relaunch quickly restores millions of visitors per month.
- February 2024 – Rise of AI-generated torrent spam detected across major indexes. Automated scripts begin uploading synthetic e-books, films, and AI-generated datasets to 1337x, RARBG clones, and Pirate Bay mirrors, prompting discussions about authenticity and metadata verification.
- March 2024 – Court in India permanently blocks Sci-Hub and LibGen after three-year trial. The Delhi High Court rules in favor of international publishers, ordering ISPs to maintain permanent access blocks, ending one of the longest-running academic-piracy cases.
- May 2024 – BitTorrent celebrates its 20th anniversary. First released in July 2001, BitTorrent reaches two decades of active protocol development. Modern clients such as qBittorrent, Deluge, and Transmission mark the event with long-term seed initiatives and nostalgia campaigns.
- August 2024 – Russia introduces mandatory "sovereign DNS" for all ISPs, blocking foreign torrent trackers. New telecommunications laws require all DNS requests to route through Roskomnadzor servers, automatically filtering The Pirate Bay, 1337x, YTS, and Z-Library domains.
- September 2024 – Archive.org ordered to pay $32 million in publishers lawsuit. A U.S. federal court finds the Internet Archive liable for copyright infringement through its digital-lending program, setting a major precedent for digital libraries.
- November 2024 – EU Commission proposes “Know Your Uploader” regulation. The initiative aims to require online platforms, including decentralized file-sharing gateways, to verify uploader identities for copyrighted material, sparking backlash from digital-rights groups.

=== 2025 ===
- January 2025 – 1337x mirror domains seized in coordinated ACE operation. The Alliance for Creativity and Entertainment announces the seizure of over 50 1337x mirrors and proxies hosted across Europe and Asia, marking one of the largest domain takedown campaigns since RARBG’s 2023 closure.
- February 2025 – UNESCO calls for global regulation of "shadow libraries". In a policy whitepaper on educational access, UNESCO warns that platforms such as Z-Library and LibGen blur the line between piracy and open knowledge, urging member states to adopt consistent legal frameworks rather than purely punitive measures.
- April 2025 – AI-driven anti-piracy systems deployed by major studios. Warner Bros. and Sony deploy real-time generative-AI tools to detect unauthorized film and music uploads across torrent indexes and streaming platforms, using watermark recognition and neural content matching.
- June 2025 – BitTorrent protocol receives open security update "BTv2". An updated specification introduces encrypted peer handshakes and IPv6-native tracker discovery, marking the first major protocol revision since 2008.
- July 2025 – Russia launches "RuTorrent National Network". The Russian government unveils a state-sanctioned torrent ecosystem for domestic film and TV distribution, combining state archives and licensed local studios under a closed tracker model.
- September 2025 – EU enacts Digital Watermarking Act. The regulation requires AI platforms and content distributors to embed verifiable watermarks into media, indirectly impacting file-sharing by increasing traceability of leaked or remixed material.
