= Torrent Project =

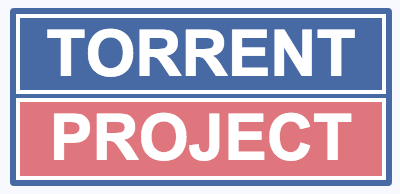

- Current status: Offline

The Torrent Project or Torrent Search Project was a metasearch engine for torrent files, which consolidated links from other popular torrent hosting pages such as ExtraTorrent. It was available as an alternative and successor for the closed Torrentz.eu and KickassTorrents sites, and its index included over 8 million torrent files, and had a clean, simple interface. Beyond allowing torrent files of popular films, it also carried self-produced content. It had an API that allowed the search function to be integrated into applications, and the news-site TorrentFreak suggested that it could have allowed streaming in the future. It had adopted the Torrents Time plugin.

The torrentproject.com URL was part of a 2014 United Kingdom High Court decision, which ordered it to be blocked. The site shut down on 4 Sep 2017. It is not clear whether TorrentProject will return.
