= Music streaming service =

Type of online service for consuming music

Music streaming services are a type of online streaming media service that focuses primarily on music, and sometimes other forms of digital audio content such as podcasts. These services are usually subscription-based services allowing users to stream digital copyright restricted songs on-demand from a centralized library provided by the service. Some services may offer free tiers with limitations, such as advertising and limits on use. They typically incorporate a recommendation system to help users discover other songs they may enjoy based on their listening history and other factors, as well as the ability to create and share public playlists with other users.

Streaming services saw a significant pace of growth during the 2010s, overtaking online music stores as the largest source of revenue to the United States music industry in 2015, and accounting for a majority since 2016. As a result of their ascendance, streaming services (as well as music-oriented content on video sharing platforms) were incorporated into the methodologies of major record charts; the "album-equivalent unit" was developed as an alternative metric for the consumption of albums, to account for digital music and streaming.

Consumers moving away from traditional physical media towards streaming platforms attributed convenience, variety, and affordability as advantages. On the contrary, streaming has also been criticized for causing performers to earn less from their music and artistry compared to physical formats (which can be as low as one-tenth of a cent per stream).

== History ==
=== Early examples ===
Digital distribution of music began to achieve prominence in the late 1990s and early 2000s, popularized by websites such as MP3.com and PeopleSound (which allowed musicians to publish tracks online for streaming, download, and/or purchase), as well as file sharing services such as Napster.

In 1999, MP3.com launched "My.MP3.com", a feature which allowed users to rip and upload music files from CDs they owned into a personal library via its "Beam-it" software, which they could then stream via their accounts. In 2000, the service was the subject of a lawsuit by Universal Music Group, UMG Recordings, Inc. v. MP3.com, Inc., which ultimately ruled that the service allowed for the unauthorized distribution of copyrighted sound recordings. Although users were required to acknowledge that they owned the music, it was not practical to verify. The lawsuit proved detrimental to MP3.com: it would be sold to UMG's parent company Vivendi Universal in May 2001, and sold to CNET in November 2003, which shut down its music distribution platform in December 2003.

In December 2001, Rhapsody was launched by the startup Listen.com, becoming the first service to offer subscription-based streaming access to a library of music online. Initially limited to content from independent labels such as Naxos, it later reached agreements to stream music from the "big five" major labels. In 2003, Roxio acquired both the online music store PressPlay and the intellectual property of Napster, and used their assets to launch "Napster 2.0"—an online music store and subscription music streaming platform.

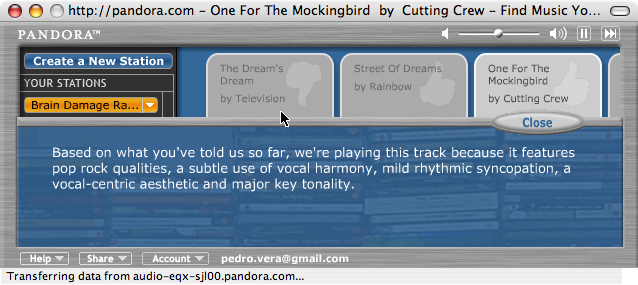
Music streaming using the Pandora Radio service

Pandora Radio launched in 2005; the service initially allowed users to create and listen to internet radio stations based on categories such as genres, which could then be personalized by giving "thumbs up" and "thumbs down" ratings to songs and artists the user liked or disliked. The service's recommendation engine, the Music Genome Project, analyzes and determines songs based on various traits. Pandora initially operated within the royalty framework enforced by SoundExchange for internet radio in the United States, resulting in operational limitations: users could not choose individual songs to play on-demand, and could only skip a limited number of songs per-hour (although users could later receive more skips by watching video advertisements). In 2008, the company joined with other internet radio companies to protest proposed rate changes by SoundExchange.

Yahoo! acquired Launch Media and its LaunchCast internet radio platform in 2001 amid the dot-com bubble; in 2005, the service evolved into Yahoo Music Unlimited, a subscription service that allowed songs to be streamed in DRM-protected Windows Media Audio (WMA), and purchased for an additional fee.

Web 2.0 services led to new avenues for music streaming: YouTube would become a prominent platform for music videos, and eventually displaced music television as their main distribution outlet. MySpace allowed musicians to publish songs to stream on their respective pages, as well as interact and engage with their fans.

=== Launch of Spotify, increasing competition ===
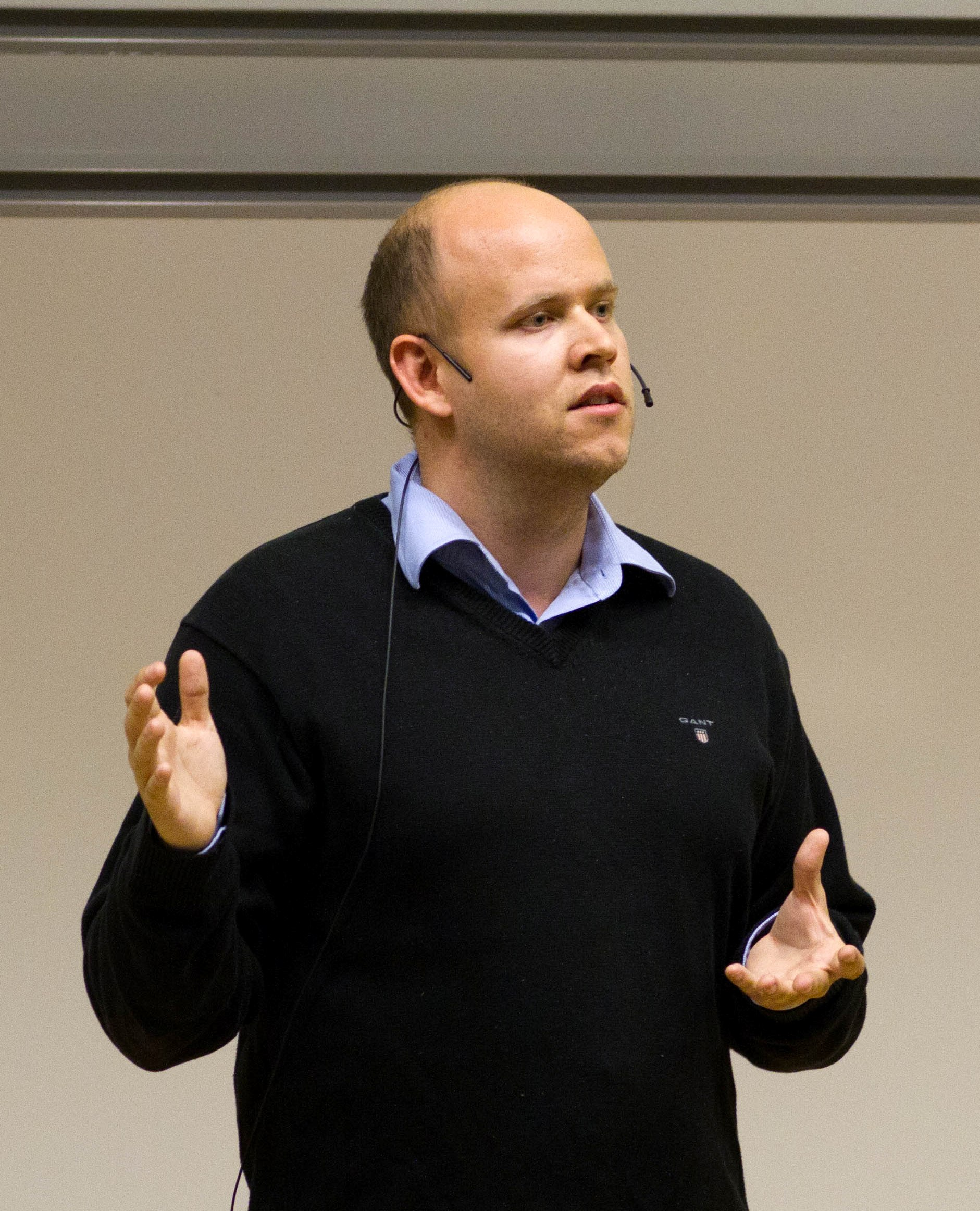
Spotify co-founder Daniel Ek in 2011.

In 2006, Swedish businessman Daniel Ek and Martin Lorentzon founded Spotify, which first launched in 2008; aiming to create a legal alternative to file sharing platforms such as Napster and Kazaa, the service allowed users to stream songs on-demand using peer-to-peer technology, and would be offered in subscription-based and ad-supported tiers. Ek stated that he wanted to "create a service that was better than piracy and at the same time compensates the music industry."

In 2006, a French music streaming website known as Blogmusiq was shut down after copyright complaints by the local royalty agency SACEM. After reaching agreements with SACEM, the site subsequently relaunched as Deezer, which reached seven million users by the end of 2009.

MTV owner Viacom partnered with Microsoft on an online music platform known as Urge, which included a music store, music videos and online radio stations, and a subscription music streaming service known as "Urge To Go". Urge was briefly integrated with Windows Media Player as a competitor to Apple's iTunes and iTunes Store, but was discontinued in 2007 amid cannibalization by Microsoft's Zune platform (which was positioned as a competitor to iPod, and used its own separate DRM and music store that was incompatible with Urge). Viacom then entered into a partnership with Rhapsody owner RealNetworks to form the joint venture Rhapsody America, and transition Urge subscribers to Rhapsody. Yahoo Music Unlimited was discontinued in July 2008, and Yahoo also directed users to Rhapsody.

In the 2010s, online streaming gradually had begun to displace radio airplay as a significant factor in the commercial success of music. Spotify officially launched in the United States in 2011, and Billboard began to increasingly include streams into the methodologies of its record charts. In 2012, Psy's K-pop song "Gangnam Style" became a major international hit, driven primarily by the viral popularity of its music video; "Gangnam Style" would become the first YouTube video to reach one billion views. "Harlem Shake"—a song by trap producer Baauer that had become associated with a viral dance meme—was boosted to number-one on the Billboard Hot 100 chart in February 2013 after U.S. YouTube views for music content were added to its methodology.

After Spotify's launch, new competing services began to emerge in the North American market, including Beats Music—which was backed by headphone maker Beats, Microsoft Groove Music Pass (formerly Xbox Music), Amazon Music Unlimited, and Google Play Music All-Access (a branch of a service also offering downloads and a music locker). Beats Electronics was later acquired by Apple Inc., which discontinued Beats Music in 2015 and replaced it with a new Apple Music service. Tidal launched in 2015 with backing from rapper Jay-Z, emphasizing high-fidelity audio and exclusive releases.

In October 2015, after initially offering "Music Key"—a subscription bundling Play Music All Access with ad-free viewing of music content on YouTube, Google launched YouTube Red— which extended ad-free access to all videos on the platform, and added premium original video content in an effort to compete with services such as Netflix. Concurrently, YouTube introduced YouTube Music, an app dedicated to music content on the platform. In 2016, Rhapsody was renamed Napster; Rhapsody had acquired Napster in 2011.

In 2017, Pandora launched a "Premium" tier, which features an on-demand service more in line with its competitors, while still leveraging its existing recommendation engine and manual curation. In October 2017, Microsoft announced the discontinuation of Groove Music Pass, and directed its users to Spotify.

In 2018, YouTube Red rebranded as YouTube Premium, and YouTube concurrently introduced a redesigned YouTube Music platform, along with a separate YouTube Music subscription at a lower price point. The YouTube Music platform can be used without a subscription, but carries video advertising, and does not support background playback on mobile devices. The YouTube Music service eventually replaced Google Play Music entirely in 2020, and Google no longer operates a digital music store.

In 2019, Beatport, an online music store primarily targeting DJs and electronic music, announced music streaming services known as Beatport Cloud and Beatport Link. The latter is designed to integrate directly with DJ software such as Serato, Rekordbox, Traktor, and its first-party web application Beatport DJ (which launched in 2021); the service targets professional DJs shifting to streaming-based models for their music libraries, as well as amateur DJs.

To increase the diversity and value of their services, music streaming services began to produce and acquire other forms of music-related content besides songs, including music documentaries and concert presentations. Spotify has similarly made investments into non-music content such as podcasts (including its acquisition of Bill Simmons' sports publication and podcast network The Ringer, and exclusive rights to The Joe Rogan Experience) and audiobooks.

== Impact and figures ==
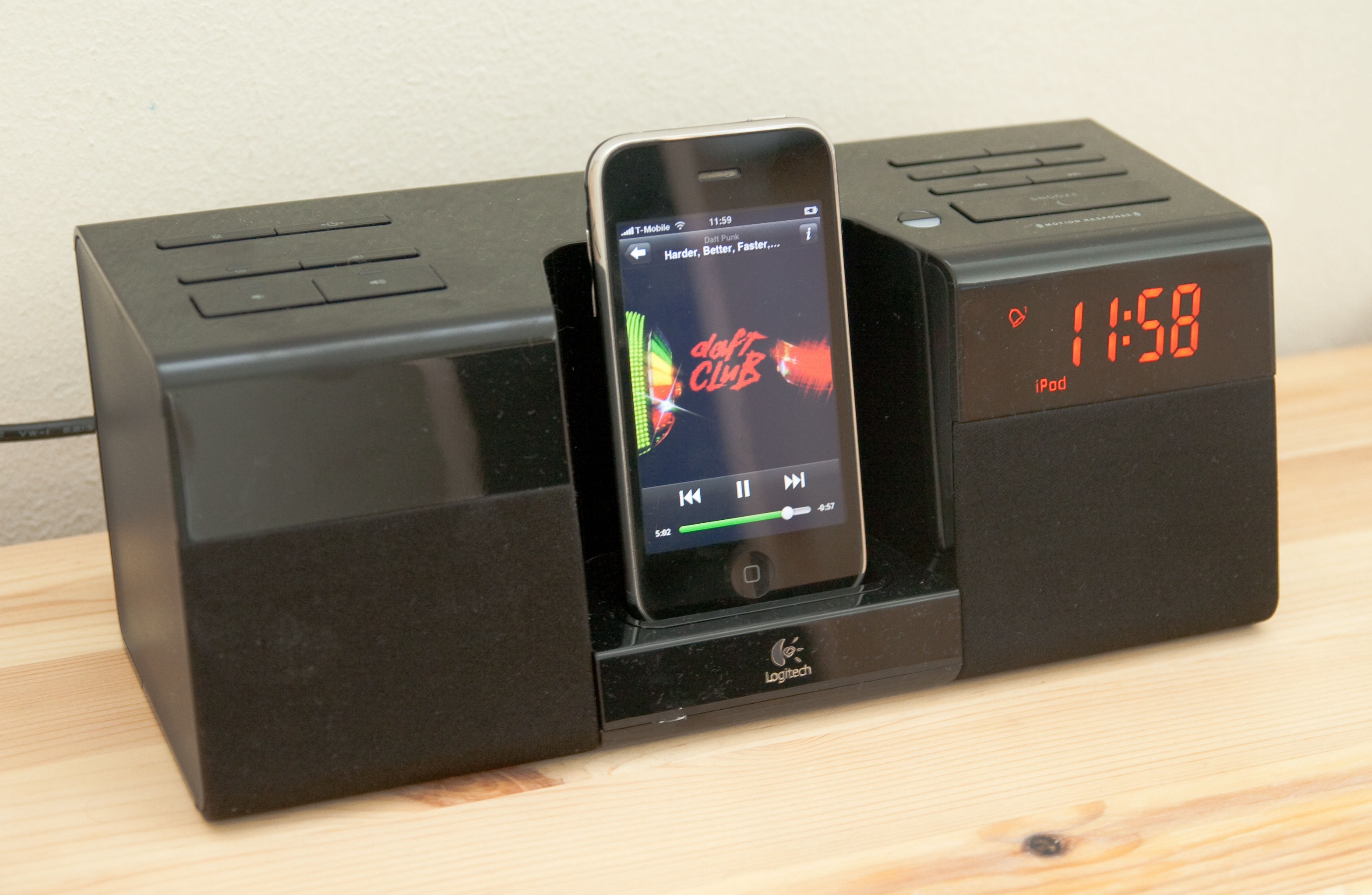
A smartphone docked on a speaker, streaming music from the Spotify service

=== Revenue and royalties ===
By 2013, on-demand music streaming had begun to displace online music stores as the main revenue stream of digital music. In 2023, the International Federation of the Phonographic Industry (IFPI) reported that growth in revenue in the music industry had increased by 11.2% compared to the previous year. In 2021—its largest increase in the past 20 years—with paid music streaming services accounting for $12.3 billion in revenue ($2.2 billion YoY), and ad-supported streaming $4.6 billion ($1.1 billion YoY). Revenue from music streaming services had more than doubled since 2017, and the estimated number of users of paid services was 667 million in 2023. In 2019, streaming services accounted for the majority of music revenue globally for the first time.

Music streaming services have faced criticism over the amount of royalties they distribute, including accusations that they do not fairly compensate musicians and songwriters. In 2013, Spotify stated that it paid artists an average of $0.007 per stream. Music Week editor Tim Ingham commented that while the figure may "initially seem alarming," he noted: "Unlike buying a CD or download, streaming is not a one-off payment. Hundreds of millions of streams of tracks are happening every day, which quickly multiplies the potential revenues on offer – and is a constant long-term source of income for artists." Amidst those rising number of streams, Spotify has also confirmed that they will require tracks "to get a minimum of 1,000 listens every year to receive royalties" starting early 2024. Additionally, some have expressed concern about the focus of streaming metrics as the primary source of monetary compensation for musicians and songwriters as streaming fraud gains traction.

When music services already face critiques for taking large cuts from artists, some say their business models help record labels profit even more. Streaming services take the revenue from songs on their platform and send it back to record labels and management companies that own the rights to the songs. These companies then take another cut before sending it to the artists. However, in the past, there were ‘royalty models’ that would allow for artists to get a share of physical albums sold, but with the creation of streaming services, those models have now become obsolete. This is the case for smaller artists, who take up a large portion of the music industry. Without an extensive fan base, these artists are not able to make a sufficient amount of money.

Streaming services have led to new types of promotional strategies for music releases. In 2016, Kanye West received attention for making multiple revisions to his album The Life of Pablo on streaming services following its initial release (including mastering tweaks and, later on, a new song), with Jayson Greene of Pitchfork comparing it to updates for computer software. In several prominent cases, artists have temporarily replaced the album covers of their existing discography to tease an upcoming release, such as Dua Lipa replacing her albums' cover art with kaleidoscopic versions to tease "Houdini", Doja Cat tinting her covers red to tease Scarlet, and Charli XCX promoting Brat by replacing the cover art of her past releases with versions mimicking the design of Brat. Brat itself was later updated with a cover carrying a rusted, scratched out look in May 2025, and then changed to read "forever <3" in June to mark its first anniversary.

An external study by DataPulse Research and piano learning app Skoove analyzed the Top 200 weekly charts in 73 countries for 59 weeks (23 May 2024–10 July 2025). Using a points-based method that weighted chart positions and credited all named artists for collaborations, the study ranked artists by cross-market chart presence. The top-ranked artists were Billie Eilish, Sabrina Carpenter, Kendrick Lamar, Bruno Mars, SZA, the Weeknd, Chappell Roan, and Lady Gaga.

=== Record charts ===
In the 2010s, record charts began to increasingly include listener data from streaming platforms into their methodologies. In March 2012, Billboard launched a new "On-Demand Songs" chart, which was added to the formula of its flagship Hot 100 chart. In January 2013, On-Demand Songs was broadened into "Streaming Songs", and YouTube views in the United States on videos containing music were added to the Hot 100 formula the following month. In 2014, the UK singles chart similarly changed its methodology to include streaming. In 2016, the GfK Entertainment charts in Germany added revenues generated from a song's availability on paid streaming platforms to its methodology; this methodology excludes streaming on free ad-supported services.

To account for streaming and the decline of album purchases, album charts began to adopt a metric known as "album-equivalent units" (AEUs), which are based on purchases of the album, and how many times individual songs from the album have been purchased or streamed.

On December 16, 2025, Billboard announced that to "better reflect an increase in streaming revenue and changing consumer behaviors", its methodology would weigh streams from users of subscription-based services more heavily (approximately two-and-a-half to one) than those from free, ad-supported services beginning in 2026. YouTube subsequently announced that it will no longer provide data to Billboard, citing that this formula was "outdated" and "ignores the massive engagement from fans who don't have a subscription".

== Comparison of major services ==
Service	Catalogue	Audio quality	Integrations / platform support
Amazon Music Unlimited	>100 million tracks	16/44.1 to 24/192 FLAC	Alexa, Fire TV, iOS/Android, CarPlay/Android Auto, and third-party audio devices
Apple Music	>100 million tracks	16/44.1 to 24/192 ALAC	Full integration with Apple devices, Siri, Shazam, CarPlay, and smart TVs
Qobuz	>100 million tracks	16/44.1 to 24/192 WAV, AIFF, ALAC, FLAC	Web player, macOS, iOS, Android, Chromecast, Samsung Smart TVs, CarPlay/Android Auto, and hi-fi audio devices
Spotify	>100 million tracks	Up to FLAC 44.1 kHz	Android, iOS, Windows, macOS, smart speakers (such as Echo and Google Home), social media platforms (including Facebook and Instagram), CarPlay/Android Auto, and Shazam
Tidal	>110 million tracks	16/44.1 to 24/192 FLAC	Android, iOS, Windows, macOS, smart TVs, hi-fi audio devices, CarPlay/Android Auto, and DJ software
YouTube Music	100 million tracks	AAC/Opus up to 256 kbps	YouTube integration, Android/iOS, Chromecast, smart TVs, and CarPlay/Android Auto
JioSaavn	80 million tracks	Up to 320 kbps	Web player, Android, iOS, Windows, macOS, smart speakers (such as Echo and Google Home), Chromecast, Smart TVs, CarPlay/Android Auto, and hi-fi audio devices

== See also ==
- Comparison of music streaming services
- Digital distribution
- Video on demand
