= Inducement rule =

Aspect of US copyright law

The inducement rule is a test a United States court can use to determine whether liability for copyright infringement committed by third parties could be assigned to the distributor of the device used to commit infringement.

== Summary of the rule ==
Originating from patent law, the inducement rule test was articulated in Justice Souter's majority opinion in MGM Studios, Inc. v. Grokster, Ltd., a significant 2005 copyright and peer-to-peer file-sharing Supreme Court case. The inducement rule holds that "one who distributes a device with the object of promoting its use to infringe copyright, as shown by clear expression or other affirmative steps taken to foster infringement, is liable for the resulting acts of infringement by third parties."

Justice Souter elaborated on the details of the test in his written opinion in Grokster, noting that liability could not be assigned through "mere knowledge of infringing potential or of actual infringing uses"; further, actions incident to the distribution of the product such as technical support would not "support liability in themselves." Instead, he wrote, "the inducement rule ... premises liability on purposeful, culpable expression and conduct." In the case of Grokster, the Court found evidence of such "expression and conduct" by noting that the two file-sharing software companies in question actively sought former Napster users, attempting to establish their respective services as alternatives once it became clear that Napster would cease to exist after judicial action; further, the companies refused to build filtering mechanisms into its software to reduce the infringing use of it by their users. Several parties with little interest to the outcome of the case have submitted amicus briefs to support the companies' position that creating such filters would be highly difficult, impractical, and non-effective (see 'Criticism'). Finally, the Court discovered evidence of a correlation between the infringing use of the software, and the companies' profits.

The Court found technology in question can still be liable under the inducement rule for potential infringement use, despite potential legal applications for activities including but not limited to exchanging research data, distributable educational materials and licensed files, and other public domain content.

== Criticism ==
Since the decision was established, several intellectual property scholars including Lawrence Lessig have charged that the inducement rule has created a "great deal of uncertainty" around technological innovation, and suggested that this uncertainty will create a "chilling effect" on future technological development. Specifically, Lessig cites issues such as the problem of increasing costs of innovation as a result of the rule, as companies and individuals will be forced to devote resources to ensuring compliance with any component of a new technology that might be now considered questionable in a particular application, and new companies in particular will be deterred from producing new products because of the large costs of potential litigation. Fred von Lohmann, an intellectual property lawyer with the Electronic Frontier Foundation, states Grokster similarly "create[s] a new theory of liability that will tie up the courts for a long time," pointing out that litigation could be used as a tool to delay the development and activity of technology-producing companies regardless of whether the software in question is able to be held liable.

Critics have also cited a variety of issues with the Court's specific language in Grokster, especially over vagueness of exactly what the rule covers. For instance, the Court writes, "The inducement rule, instead, premises liability on purposeful, culpable expression and conduct..." Because "inducement" is defined so broadly, say critics, it seems plausible that many current products could violate the same three principles as Grokster - one could argue that the marketing of the popular mp3 player known as the iPod meets all three criteria that the court proposed: 1) Apple's advertising campaign "Rip, Mix and Burn" can be interpreted as a direct incitement to copyright infringement, 2) Apple has not taken visible steps to discourage copyright infringement (i.e., the iPod plays MP3 files which are widely distributed on file-sharing sites, rather than creating or relying on a more restrictive format that would ensure that the user had purchased the files they were playing), and 3) Apple benefits monetarily from copyright infringement, as they sell iPods that can store up to 120 gigabytes of music—which vastly exceeds most users' libraries of legally obtained music—which "can only be meant for storing illegally downloaded music," according to one critic.

== See also ==
- Columbia Pictures Industries, Inc. v. Fung, a Ninth Circuit case upholding a finding of inducement by the operator of isoHunt.
