= Simon Moon =

Simon Moon may refer to:

- Simon Moon (Frasier), a minor character in the television sitcom Frasier
- Simon Moon, an anarchistic character in The Illuminatus! Trilogy novels from 1975
- Simon Moon, former owner of the ED2k links site ShareReactor
- Simon on the Moon, the alias of Swedish songwriter Simon Hessman
