= Columbia Pictures Industries, Inc. v. Fung =

Columbia Pictures, Inc. v. Fung
- Court: United States Court of Appeals for the Ninth Circuit
- Full case name: Columbia Pictures Industries, Inc. v. Fung
- Decided: March 21, 2013

Court membership
- Judges sitting: Harry Pregerson, Raymond C. Fisher and Marsha Berzon

Keywords
- contributory copyright infringement, Safe Harbor, DMCA

Columbia Pictures Industries, Inc. v. Fung 710 F.3d 1020 No. 10-55946, was a United States Court of Appeals for the Ninth Circuit case in which seven film studios including Columbia Pictures Industries, Inc., Disney and Twentieth Century Fox sued Gary Fung, the owner of isoHunt Web Technologies, Inc., for contributory infringement of their copyrighted works. The panel affirmed in part and vacated in part the decision of United States District Court for the Central District of California that the services and websites offered by isoHunt Web Technologies allowed third parties to download infringing copies of Columbia's works. Ultimately, Fung had "red flag knowledge" of the infringing activity on his systems, and therefore IsoHunt was held ineligible for the Digital Millennium Copyright Act § 512(c) safe harbor.

== Background and case history ==
Columbia Pictures Industries, Inc., a part of Sony Pictures Entertainment, is one of the leading production companies and distribution studios in the world. Gary Fung, is the owner of torrent websites, including isoHunt, a BitTorrent search engine, Torrentbox, Podtropolis and ed2k-it. This case, was originally filed in the Southern District of New York, and transferred, on Fung's motion, to the Central District of California.

The district court ruled that Fung had committed copyright infringement by allowing inducement of Columbia's copyrighted material over the Bit Torrent peer-to-peer network. The court also held that Fung was not entitled to protection from damages liability under any of the safe harbor provisions of the Digital Millennium Copyright Act, 17 U.S.C. § 512(a). Furthermore, the court entered a permanent injunction that prohibited Fung from engaging in any activity that would infringe Columbia's copyrighted works.

Fung appealed, contesting the district court's ruling of copyright infringement as well as his ineligibility for safe harbor protection under the DMCA. Citing violations to his right of free speech, Fung argued that the injunction was 'punitive and unduly vague'.

== Discussion ==
The circuit court reviewed two aspects of the district court's decisions about the liability determination and the scope of the injunction.

=== Liability ===
The 'Inducement' theory on which the district court's holding was based upon referred to the Supreme Court's case of Grokster III, which delved into the application of copyright law to file sharing over P2P networks. Grokster III stated that the inducement rule had four elements:

(1) The distribution of a device or product: Fung argued that because he had not developed the Bit Torrent programs or protocols, there was no new 'device' on which the plaintiff could predicate its theory of liability under the inducement rule. The court rejected Fung's argument, writing: "Unlike patents, copyrights protect expression, not products or devices. Inducement liability is not limited, either logically or as articulated in Grokster III, to those who distribute a 'device.' As a result, one can infringe a copyright through culpable actions resulting in the impermissible reproduction of copyrighted expression, whether those actions involve making available a device or product or providing some service used in accomplishing the [alleged infringement.]" This element of inducement liability, the court held, requires only that defendant engaged in a process leading to the unauthorized reproduction of a plaintiff's copyrighted expression, and there was no question that Fung had done at least that much.

(2) Acts of infringement: Columbia successfully proved copyright infringement on the basis of inducement theory by providing evidence of actual infringement by users of Fung's services. Columbia showed that the process of uploading violated their exclusive right to distribution, and that downloading the copyrighted material violated their right to reproduction.

(3) An object of promoting its use to infringe copyright: This requirement for induced liability was that device or service be distributed with the "object of promoting its use to infringe copyright, as shown by clear expression or other affirmative steps taken to foster infringement." The clear expressions and steps provided explanations to prove an improper object. isoHunt featured a list of "Box Office Movies," which corresponded to the highest-grossing movies playing in the US theaters. Fung posted several messages, encouraging isoHunt users to upload torrent files of copyrighted materials that could be then available for download. A distributor's communication to the users through messages was important to prove inducement liability.

(4) Causation: Fung argued that the plaintiffs could not demonstrate all of the allegedly infringing downloads by third parties could be traced to services provided by isoHunt. Columbia maintained that a less stringent causal link should suffice, at least at the preliminary-injunction stage of the case. The court accepted Columbia's argument, finding the disputed causal links to be relevant to damages (to be determined later in the proceedings) rather than liability. The court added: "We are mindful, however, of the potential severity of a loose causation theory for inducement liability. Under this theory of liability, the only causation requirement is that the product or service at issue was used to infringe the plaintiff’s copyrights. The possible reach of liability is enormous, particularly in the digital age." The court went on to identify many considerations that might undermine a copyright plaintiff's causation claims, though such considerations did not appear relevant to Fung's defense.

=== DMCA Safe Harbor Analysis ===
Fung sought protection under three of the DMCA's safe harbor provisions, 17 U.S.C(a), (c), (d). The district court had rejected protection under DMCA 512(a) since the provision only applied to "transitory" networks, which was not applicable because isoHunt never actually touched any of the copyrighted content. However, the circuit court rejected this ruling stating that:

The district court should not have rejected this safe harbor on the ground that it did. Perfect 10, Inc. v. CCBill LLC, 488 F.3d 1102 (9th Cir. 2007), held that the § 512(a) safe harbor does not require that the service provider transmit or route infringing material, explaining that "[t]here is no requirement in the statute that the communications must themselves be infringing, and we see no reason to import such as a requirement."

However, the court still rejected safe harbors for isoHunt because the trackers used by Fung generated information used for further infringing. Therefore, the websites were protected as service providers, but not as trackers. The district court had rejected the § 512(c) safe harbor for Fung for the same reason it had rejected the protection for the § 512(a) safe harbor. However, the circuit court maintained that the § 512(c) safe harbor covered not only the storage of the infringing content, but also the infringing activities that use the content on the system or network. Fung was denied eligibility for the § 512(c) safe harbor since the provision was only available if the service provider did not have knowledge that the content used on the system was infringing or was not aware of the facts or circumstances from which the infringing activity was apparent. The court maintained that Fung had "red flag knowledge" of the infringing activity on his systems and was thus ineligible for the § 512(c) safe harbor. The court also argued that the advertising on the site constituted a financial benefit from the infringing activity. Fung promoted advertising by attracting the site visitors who wished to engage in the infringing activity. Thus, a solid connection between the infringing activity and the revenue generation was established, and Fung was declared ineligible for protection under the § 512 (c)(1)(b) safe harbor.

=== Scope of Injunction ===
The court ruled that the injunction was vague because the injunction imposed the expectation that Fung remove all the "infringement-related terms" from the metadata and the webpages. The court also held that the certain provisions in the injunctions prevented Fung from working in any technology company whose services could be used to infringe copyrighted content even if those companies aren't liable for copyright infringement. By preventing Fung from seeking legitimate employment, the court held that the provisions in the injunction were too burdensome.

== Court's decision ==
The circuit court affirmed the district court's grant of summary judgment to Columbia, ruling that Fung was liable for inducing copyright infringement. The court also affirmed summary judgment to Columbia in dismissing Fung's claims of being eligible for protection under the DMCA safe harbor provisions. However, the grounds of judgment differed from those of the district court.

The circuit, however, accepted Fung's appeal of the injunction being too vague and burdensome and modified the permanent injunction.

In the end, costs of $110 million in damages were imposed on to Fung.

== Significance and Impact ==
Columbia v. Fung was one of the few cases since Grokster where a court applied an "inducement" theory of copyright, rather than one of contributory or vicarious infringement. Furthermore, at the time, this case was also the only known case in which a service provider was disqualified from DMCA safe harbor provisions due to having enough "red flag knowledge" of infringing activity. Evidence of this red flag knowledge included Fung's own active encouragement of infringing activity (listing top 20 grossing movies, inviting users to upload a torrent file of these movies, etc.) and his own personal use of isoHunt to download infringing material.

Fung demonstrated that the Supreme Court's Grokster ruling was one that would come to be taken seriously as precedent. As such, any file-sharing website that has no filtering or moderating mechanism for copyrighted material while financially benefiting in any way (even with an ad-revenue model) will likely be liable for inducing copyright infringement upon litigation.

A further implication to be taken from Fung is that courts will find any file-sharing technology to be legally indistinguishable regardless of their technical specifications, e.g. whether servers are hosted centrally or peer-to-peer. Courts may furthermore assume that all P2P file-sharing will engage in copyright infringement. In the context of Fung, Grokster, and other related cases, this shifts the analysis of a service provider's liability of copyright infringement to the "front-end" of file-sharing technology, i.e. how the user interface assists the user in infringing activities. In Fung, this was a central factor in determining Fung's liability for inducing copyright infringement (e.g. providing a list top 20 grossing movies).

== Criticisms ==
The circuit court's decision has been criticized for going above and beyond the original ruling of Grokster by the Supreme Court when it ruled that "inducement liability is not limited...to those who distribute a device". By doing so, the court effectively disregards the first requirement (distribution of a device or product for infringement) in the four factors of inducement liability and expands copyright infringement to not only distributing a device or product but also a service that can be used to engage in infringing activity.

The circuit court has also been criticized for its lack of discussion on holding Fung liable on grounds of sufficient "red flag knowledge", when it has been the first major case to deem someone to have had "reasonable red flag knowledge". Most cases have required specific knowledge of infringing files, usually through a valid DMCA takedown notice, but 'Fung' departs from this and instead cites Fung's supposedly infringement-encouraging behavior, such as providing a list of the top 20 grossing movies that have still been in release, as evidence that "he must have known it was infringing". A website operator that utilizes a user interface feature that organizes user activity but that may also come to "highlight infringing activity" (e.g. a "Top Downloaded" list that happens to consist of copyrighted content) can potentially be inferred to fall under copyright inducement liability

Fung also introduced a new "loose causation" theory, on which DMCA safe harbor disqualification can be based on lack of evidence of substantial cause for third-party infringements. Are infringements caused by a search engine tool such as isoHunt, or are the infringements on top search lists a mere reflection of existing market demand?

In linking the advertising revenue stream with infringement activity, the court has been criticized for making an erroneous connection. Ad revenue is proportionate to any usage of the site, whether infringing or not. By deeming that this ad revenue was Fung's deriving a direct financial benefit from infringing activity, it potentially implies that any site that has advertisement and some sort of infringement will invalidate DMCA safe harbor for any service provider that hosts advertising.

More generally speaking, Grokster and its related cases, including Fung, have been criticized for its stifling of innovation and competition by increasing the threat of litigation for file-sharing technology. As Harvard Law Professor Lawrence Lessig put it:

By making it a process that goes through the courts, you've just increased the legal uncertainty around innovation substantially and created great opportunities to defeat legitimate competition. You've shifted an enormous amount of power to those who oppose new types of competitive technologies. Even if in the end, you as the innovator are right, you still spent your money on lawyers instead of on marketing or a new technology.

In Congress, we might have a lot of argument about what the statute should look like. But that would be a process that would resolve this intensely political issue politically. Instead, Justice Souter engages in common-law lawmaking, which is basically judges making up the law they want to apply to this particular case. And not just Supreme Court judges -- what they've done is invite a wide range of common-law lawmaking by judges around the country trying to work out the details of what this intent standard really is.

As a result, Lessig argues, innovation will only be "channeled in ways the copyright owners can agree to, or channeled in ways that avoids any kind of possibility of this litigation".

== See also ==
- MGM Studios, Inc. v. Grokster, Ltd.
- Perfect 10, Inc. v. CCBill LLC
