= Showstash =

File sharing website

Show Stash
- Website type: Archived screen capture
- Owner: Unknown
- Creator: Unknown
- Website: Showstash.com
- Current status: Defunct

Showstash.com was a website that cataloged hyperlinks to television shows, cartoons, anime, and feature films. In July 2007, ShowStash.com was sued by the Motion Picture Association of America (MPAA) for copyright infringement, and the site was subsequently shut down.

== History ==
The Showstash.com domain name was registered on October 30, 2006 and the website was first available to the public two weeks later. It listed 2093 episodes of 247 shows when it launched.

The site was shut down after the MPAA sued its owners in July 2007 (Disney Enterprises v. Showstash.com). According to the judges, Showstash.com was guilty of contributory copyright infringement because they «searched for, identified, collected, and indexed links to illegal copies of movies and TV shows». The total copyrights damages caused by Showstash.com was estimated at $2.7 million, an estimation based on 108 titles linked from Showstash.com that brings the per-title damage cost to $25,000. Following the court order, the defendants confidentially settled a smaller fine with the plaintiff, namely Columbia Pictures, Disney Enterprises, Paramount Pictures, Twentieth Century Fox Film, Universal City Studios, Universal City Studios Productions and Warner Bros Entertainment.

Cinematube.net was also caught in this trial. While this gave a lot of publicity to little-known websites such as Showstash.com, the MPAA still hit them hard in its push to crack down all illegal distribution of copyrighted content online. The MPAA sued Showstash.com two weeks after it was awarded $110 million in damages in its legal battle against TorrentSpy. Pullmylink.com, Peekvid.com, Youtvpc.com, Ssupload.com, and Videohybrid.com were also targets of the MPAA, who identified them as «one-stop shops for copyright infringement». Right after the Showstash trial, the MPAA went after Fomdb.com and Movierumor.com.

Showstash.com's traffic had reached more than 2 million unique visitors monthly before closing down. Currently, the domain name Showstash.com redirects to an open proxy service and has no content for streaming or download.

== Description ==
ShowStash.com contained a collection of links to multimedia organized into four main categories: television shows, anime, cartoons, and movies. The ShowStash.com update process, performed daily, involved verifying reported links and adding new video links submitted by users both on the community forums and via the submission form. ShowStash.com relied on its users to maintain the site; its staff was in constant communication with frequent visitors by way of the forums. It was powered by a custom PHP script that was custom developed for the site.

== See also ==
- Case number for PACER access: 2:2007cv04510.
- Operation Red Card
