= Torrents-Time =

- Release: February 2, 2016; 10 years ago
- Operating system: Windows, Mac
- Website: torrents-time.com
- Repository: github.com/torrentsTime

Torrents-Time is a browser plugin that allows websites to have the same functionality as the popular Popcorn Time program, without requiring the client to download an application. Released 2 February 2016, sites such as The Pirate Bay and the now defunct KickassTorrents others supported the plugin within days, allowing for in-browser streaming of popular videos. Only two weeks into its history it was attacked by anti-piracy groups on a number of grounds. The security of the plugin has been questioned, especially its reliance on cross-origin resource sharing and parts of its javascript implementation which could end up compromising a target computer and stealing information about the source. However, the Torrents-Time team claims these fears are exaggerations and based "half-truths".

== See also ==
- Butter Project
