= Choruss =

Choruss was a three-year experimental effort launched in 2008 by Warner Music Group and record-industry/Internet technology expert Jim Griffin to develop a licensed system for peer-to-peer music file sharing among college students. The idea was to establish a voluntary, blanket licensing system for users of college networks, experimenting with different licensing models and technology at different universities. Although the project was supported by many universities, the National Music Publishers Association, and three of the four major record labels at the time—Warner, Sony BMG, and EMI, with Universal being the only holdout—the service never launched, and the project was discontinued when its charter ended in late 2010.

According to Griffin, Choruss wasn't viable primarily due to the music industry's failure to coordinate licensing among the various rights holders with a stake in sound recordings. Without the functionality of a central registry, it was anticipated that less than half of the rights holders could be identified for the music students would be sharing. Doubtful that record companies would fund development of a global rights registry themselves, Griffin and his company is now working with the World Intellectual Property Organization (WIPO) to develop the International Music Registry (IMR).

== Proposals and criticism ==
Choruss was always going to allow any files to be shared among participants. Initially, it was said they could use any file-sharing technology they wanted. However, later in its development, Choruss partnered with former file-sharing pariah Audiogalaxy as the basis of the system.

In 2009, and again in 2010, although it never came to pass, Griffin said that various universities would introduce Choruss later that year, with each university using a different model. For example, some would require all students to participate, some would be opt-in, some would be opt-out. Some would use a central server, some would use technology to determine what's being shared, others would rely on self-reporting. Some would base payments on downloads, others on "plays". Pricing would vary. The results of the tests would be studied to figure out and learn from what "works".

Griffin envisioned Choruss providing a platform upon which different licensing models, even partially "free" ones, could be built. One such model was upselling people on cable TV-like license & service bundles from ISPs. But file-sharing advocate and technology policy blogger Mike Masnick called this a "tax" on students that, when rolled out to ISPs instead of just universities, would usher in de facto compulsory licensing (e.g., every ISP customer subsidizing the file-sharing of a few). Musician Dave Allen, paraphrased by Masnick, pointed out that consumers hate such bundling and actively seek ways to avoid it, and that more generally, Choruss was doomed because its direct-licensing strategy is "a plan based on what's best for the existing stakeholders, not the customers." Masnick continued, "it seeks to perpetuate the old model, where you have to 'get' money out of others in order to 'allow' them to do something."

Griffin acknowledged another shortcoming: students were skeptical of a license which wouldn't cover their file-sharing activity on off-campus networks.
