= Peekvid =

Online video cataloging website

- Website type: Online video cataloging
- Owner: "2 Australians" including Joshua

Peekvid.com was a website that cataloged links to various TV shows and movies to make them more easily accessible to the public.

== History ==
Peekvid was set up in March 2004 and registered in Canada. KeepVid, an affiliated site, was registered with an address in the Cayman Islands and the same Australian e-mail address.

Late in the evening (GMT) on February 6, 2007, PeekVid closed to public access, announcing that it had entered a (presumably private) beta testing stage. All that remained was a form to submit an e-mail address to be informed of updates. It was speculated that there may have been some form of legal action against PeekVid, and that this "beta testing" screen was a way of bowing out temporarily without admitting defeat. According to sources including The Jerusalem Post and The Australian, PeekVid was closed down due to copyright violations. PeekVid was also the target of law enforcement in Australia and other countries.

PeekVid was re-launched with an updated interface (named PeekVid Beta) on February 12, 2007, after a nearly week-long hiatus. Around half of the movies had been removed as part of an updating process that involved removing dead links and attempts to replace them, as well as ensuring that the site worked more efficiently on various browsers and with new links to videos.

In June 2007, the MPAA sued PeekVid (and Youtvpc.com) for contributory copyright infringement because it «searched for, identified, collected, and indexed links to illegal copies of movies and TV shows». The MPAA stated that Peekvid.com recorded 50K visitors daily. Peekvid tried to play the "just links" card and reminded the press that it worked towards a solution that protected the industry's copyrights, but the MPAA did not bow. YouTube's senior director of marketing Julie Supan had said YouTube was aware of PeekVid, and that it did not violate YouTube's TOS, involuntarily mirroring the copyright violation issue on YouTube.

Peekvid recently had to shut down again due to "unviable server fees". The domain name is now inactive (November 2019).

== Description ==
Peekvid.com was a website that cataloged links to TV shows and movies. Peekvid did not host any video clip content itself; users provided the links, categorized them, and uploaded them to the site. Video hosting sites that were linked to Peekvid included YouTube, Google Video and Dailymotion. To avoid being easily found by copyrights owners on YouTube, uploaders of copyrighted content would usually alter the name of the content ("Friends" would become "Riendsf"). Since this would also make it difficult for users to find those videos, websites like Peekvid.com acted as double-blind key that made illegal content posted on YouTube easily discoverable.

Peekvid.com was owned by "2 Australians" including Joshua.

== KeepVid ==
As stated above, the affiliated site KeepVid was a video download manager named in such articles as "Video piracy's new battleground" (The Age, 2006) and "Service lets people rip videos from YouTube, other sites" (CNET 2006), was registered with an address in the Cayman Islands and the same Australian e-mail address as Peekvid.com. As of November 2013, KeepVid remained operable, and as described in a CNET article titled "How to download videos from YouTube, Vimeo, and more" (March 28, 2012): KeepVid "is likely the fastest way to grab just about any video from the Web. YouTube, DailyMotion, Megavideo, Metacafe, and Vimeo are just a few of the sites compatible with KeepVid."

As of March 17, 2018, KeepVid shut down its download services on its website and now displays tips on how to download videos and music legally through various methods.

== See also ==
- Showtash
- TorrentSpy
