= Demonoid =

BitTorrent website

- Screenshot Demonoid logo and screenshot of homepage.
- Website type: Torrent index, magnet links provider
- Available in: English
- Creator: Deimos
- Revenue: Advertisements (banners), donations
- Website: https://www.demonoid.is
- Commercial: No
- Registration: Required
- Launched: April 21, 2003; 23 years ago
- Current status: Offline

Demonoid is a BitTorrent tracker and website founded in 2003 to facilitate file-sharing–related discussion and provide a searchable index of torrent files. The site underwent intermittent periods of extended downtime in its history due to the occasional need to move the server, generally caused by cancellation of ISP service due to local political pressure.

Reports announced the accidental death of its founder Deimos in August 2018. Following the event, the website was closed on September 17, 2018. In July 2019, Demonoid staffers launched a new version of the website to revive the project.

== Features and policies ==
Demonoid features RSS with different feeds for each of its torrent categories and their sub-categories. It tracked and displayed users' upload/download ratios. In its early years, they took no action against users with low ratios (members who download more than they share). The website did have a time when they banned users with low ratios but stopped doing so due to the ratio system being inaccurate for some users, such as those with dynamic IP addresses.

Demonoid prohibits linking to torrents containing pornographic material and malicious software. In addition to forums, the website features an IRC channel, #demonoid at P2P-Network, which supports discussion among users.

== History ==
Demonoid was founded on April 21, 2003, by a Mexican Internet user known under the pseudonym of 'Deimos'. It initially worked as a fully-private BitTorrent tracker with intermittent periods of open registrations. From the mid-2000s, Demonoid grew as one of the largest trackers in the world along with The Pirate Bay, which led to an increase in legal threats from copyright owners.

On April 10, 2008, Deimos stepped down as the administrator of Demonoid, citing a number of reasons and "distraction with real-world issues". He also stated that he has "handed the reins over to a new administrator" – "a close friend of [his]", whom he trusts completely and has the knowledge and time to take care of the site. Over the course of the next few days, RSS feeds for the site came back online and by April 16, 2008, a mass email was sent out to all Demonoid users informing that the site was "finally back online."

The official explanation read as follows:

A few months ago, the site administrator (known as Deimos), lacked the time necessary to maintain this website. For personal reasons, Deimos decided to resign from his position as a member of the site staff. Before leaving, Deimos picked a new site administrator from among his friends. The old moderator team remained unchanged and will continue helping with the site. The Demonoid team will try to keep everything running just as it always has been. The trackers and website seem to be working properly, and should any issues arise, they will be taken care of as soon as possible. If we work on any problems over the next few days, the site might be going on and offline. We apologize in advance if this should happen. Welcome back and enjoy!

— Umlauf, Demonoid site admin

In August 2012, Deimos faced criminal investigation in Mexico, and was eventually released from jail in February 2013. After a decrease in the audience during the 2010s, he was reportedly working in early 2018 to rebuild the website to the thriving community of the previous decade. Deimos died in an accident in August 2018, leading to the closure of Demonoid on September 17, 2018. In July 2019, staff of the original community relaunched the website.

== Legal issues ==
In a 2007 study, Slyck.com found twelve cease and desist letters to users of Demonoid. On September 25, 2007, the Demonoid website, forums and trackers went offline. They came back four days later with the exception of the website, which came back the day after. Over the next few days, the website continued experiencing intermittent downtime until October 2, 2007. The explanation as widely speculated was that they had received a letter from a lawyer for the Canadian Recording Industry Association threatening legal action. Demonoid began blocking Canadian traffic, a strategy similar to that taken by isoHunt and TorrentSpy in blocking American traffic to avoid RIAA complaints. Visitors from Canadian-based IPs would be redirected to the downtime version of the website, which contained an explanation of the legal threats. However, it was still possible for Canadians to visit the website at that time using proxy servers. Additionally, while the website may have been blocked in Canada at the time, the tracker was still readily accepting Canadian IP addresses.

The threats are in spite of the open question of the legality of music file sharing in Canada. The CRIA has neither confirmed nor denied its involvement despite Demonoid's claims.

On November 9, 2007, the site again went offline, reportedly due to legal threats to their service provider from the Canadian Recording Industry Association. A placeholder page stated, "The CRIA threatened the company renting the servers to us, and because of this it is not possible to keep the site online. Sorry for the inconvenience and thanks for your understanding." According to the IRC channel, the trackers themselves were not affected. Six days later, the placeholder page was updated with a link to a new forum, unrelated to file sharing, for the community. On November 29, 2007, Deimos posted on that forum a problem preventing the site from coming back up:

"Money is an issue, but the real problem at the moment is finding a suitable place to host the website. There has been no luck there. And there's some personal stuff I need to take care of that takes most of my time at the moment, and that does not help."

The site then came back online on April 11, 2008. The homepage announced that the site had a new administrator and that the old one (Deimos) had left for personal reasons.

== Technical issues ==
=== Website downtime ===
Demonoid experienced a prolonged downtime in late 2009 due to hardware failure. On September 14, 2009, Demonoid's torrent tracker went down after it was reported that they had experienced a number of hardware problems stemming from power outages. The tracker returned to service on November 5, and the main site returned on December 13. A message was posted on the homepage stating that "We might have to shut down everything to fix and prevent further damage," and that it could be "days maybe, until we can change the power circuit." During the downtime that followed, several new messages appeared, mostly providing updates on the repair status and promising that the site would return soon. On November 4, 2009, the tracker, which communicates with a BitTorrent client, began responding to some torrents and returned to full operation on November 17. The main site, however, did not become operational until December 13, 2009.

On April 26, 2010, Demonoid.com, started experiencing downtime or extreme slowness. A message was posted on the site that it was due to a denial-of-service attack, which has subsided as of July 2010. The site temporarily banned Taiwanese and Chinese IP ranges.

On July 24, 2012, Demonoid.me suffered another denial-of-service attack, bringing the site down for an indeterminate amount of time. The following week, its hosting provider, ColoCall, terminated its contract with Demonoid. An anonymous ColoCall source reported that the Ukrainian police had raided the hosting provider and seized Demonoid's data. However, according to the Ministry of Internal Affairs in Ukraine, the termination occurred without police intervention. No explanation has been given for the prolonged downtime, nor was there any word about the site's return until March 2014.

On November 12, 2012, demonoid.me began resolving to an IP address based in Hong Kong, where a tracker was operating. The tracker did not accept new torrents, but honored existing ones. However, the website and forums remained offline. The tracker went offline on December 15, 2012, first actively refusing all connections, and then becoming unreachable when demonoid.me's DNS servers went down.

In November 2013, demonoid.me and demonoid.ph started redirecting to demonoid.com, whose website began displaying a page that hints at a possible comeback of the site, with the message "We will rebuild! Coming back soon, please check back later. Thanks for your visit!!" along with a Bitcoin donation link. On January 9, 2014, a tracker came online at inferno.demonoid.com and quickly became one of the five busiest BitTorrent trackers on the Internet; in only a few hours, the tracker was coordinating the communication of 1.3 million people scattered across 388,321 torrent files.

In March 2014, after 20 months of downtime, the Demonoid BitTorrent tracker came back online. Former users were still able to use their login details, and most of the old torrents were still listed on the site. In July 2018, Demonoid stopped working on all used domains. The issues are related to server-side problems. There are no backups or mirrors on the internet.

=== Domain name changes ===
On December 2, 2010, Demonoid changed its domain from .com to a .me address, to avoid US government seizure. In April 2012, the website changed its domain to a .ph TLD, and started an open beta of the new site on Demonoid.me. On June 15, 2012, Demonoid reverted to its previous .me domain, but returned to the .ph domain a week later. The Demonoid website and tracker last went offline in July 2012 for a period of nearly two years, the longest hiatus ever. At the time it went offline, Demonoid was hosted by an ISP in Ukraine. Subsequent signs of activity led to no new developments until March 29, 2014, when the site, once again, went online. The revived site now uses a remote server.

On May 7, 2013, d2, an unofficial website based on Demonoid's databases went live at d2.vu, with hosting provided by the U.S.-based service RamNode. Around November 2013, a website showing the Demonoid logo and saying "We will rebuild!" came online at the .com domain, and the .me and .ph domains began redirecting web traffic to it, indicating they are all under the control of the same owner. In January 2014, a tracker came online at the .com domain and provided service for the old torrents. On March 29, 2014, Demonoid came back online at the demonoid.ph domain. On December 3, 2014, domain name was changed to demonoid.pw.

On February 17, 2019, an official statement was made stating that ownership of demonoid.pw was lost and to avoid visiting it. In August 2019, Demonoid came back online at dnoid.to with registrations open intermittently.

On November 2, 2019, the website moved to the domain demonoid.is to distance itself from scams.

== d2 ==
During one of Demonoid's downtimes, an unofficial website based on Demonoid's databases was launched on May 7, 2013. The site went live at http://www.d2.vu/ with hosting provided by the U.S.-based service RamNode. d2's administrators stated, "No former admins have been involved with this rebranding or launch. This effort is independent and undertaken entirely for the benefit of the community."

Based on a Demonoid backup, d2 contained Demonoid's torrent and user databases. All previously registered Demonoid users were able to log in using their already existing Demonoid accounts, while new invite codes were being generated. Unlike Demonoid, d2 had no user forums, and to minimize legal risk, the site had no torrent tracker; all torrents instead used public trackers. RamNode eventually terminated d2's hosting and, in August 2013, d2.vu was hosted on a server in Sweden. d2 closed on March 30, 2014, when Demonoid went back up.
