= Audiogalaxy =

Music sharing service

- Website type: Music
- Website: www.audiogalaxy.com
- Commercial: Yes
- Current status: Closed

Audiogalaxy was an Internet music service with three incarnations. From 1998 to 2002, it was a file sharing system that indexed MP3 files. From mid-2002 to mid-2010, it was a promotional website for the Rhapsody music subscription service. Finally, from mid-2010 through 2012, it was a personal audio place shifting service. Audiogalaxy ceased operations on January 31, 2013.

== History ==
The original Audiogalaxy system was created in 1998 by Michael Merhej as an FTP site index called The Borg Search. It offered a peer-to-peer file-sharing system with a web-based client and search engine (Audiogalaxy Satellite), with always-on searching and auto-resume. In 2001, it gained ground among users migrating from Napster.

Audiogalaxy's stated mission was to facilitate sharing of music. Its per-artist/per-genre peer-moderated internet forums allowed users to reach content across different genres.

In June 2008, CNET hailed this incarnation of Audiogalaxy as one of the "greatest defunct websites".

=== Conflict with RIAA over sharing of copyrighted material ===
In May 2001, Audiogalaxy implemented "groups" which allowed group members to send songs to everyone in the group. Hackers used this backdoor to circumvent the "blocked songs" restriction, where Audiogalaxy could deny transfer of specific copyrighted songs. In addition, even when a specific file was blocked, it would often be replaced by an identical file with the group or song incorrectly spelled. For example, if "Wish You Were Here" by Pink Floyd were blocked, another track with the same title, but credited to "Pink Lloyd", would suddenly appear. The latter file would be completely identical to the former; however, since Audiogalaxy would never have received any notification for "Pink Lloyd," the downloading of that track would not be affected.

Even though Audiogalaxy claimed that they were trying to cooperate with the music industry and block copyrighted songs from their network, many of the network's users continued to share unauthorized copyrighted music files, causing Audiogalaxy to face a lawsuit by the RIAA on May 24, 2002. On this day, Audiogalaxy blocked sending of all blocked songs. A month later on June 17, 2002, Audiogalaxy reached an out-of-court settlement with the RIAA. The settlement reached would allow Audiogalaxy to operate a "filter-in" system, which required that for any music available, the songwriter, music publisher, and/or recording company must first consent to the use and sharing of the work.

=== Partnerships and end of P2P operations ===
On September 8, 2002, Audiogalaxy licensed and re-branded a for-pay streaming service called Rhapsody from Listen.com.

From 2008 through 2010, Audiogalaxy worked with failed Choruss venture headed by Warner Music Group and longtime record-industry/Internet technology expert Jim Griffin. Choruss was an experimental effort to monetize peer-to-peer file sharing among college students, and Audiogalaxy software was to provide a possible technological basis for the system.

Until mid-2010, some of the message boards remained active, but the Audiogalaxy website only promoted the Rhapsody subscription service and its featured artists. It also briefly promoted the original incarnation of Merhej's FolderShare project, before that service was acquired by Microsoft.

=== Relaunch ===
In mid-2010, Audiogalaxy was quietly relaunched as a placeshifting service. Public announcements followed in October 2010, along with acknowledgments that Choruss was dead.

This incarnation of Audiogalaxy service enabled MP3 and AAC files stored on an Internet-connected computer to be searched and streamed on-demand for playback on a separate, Internet-connected computer, phone, or other device. Special software had to be installed on the computer hosting the music files. The files could then be browsed and played through a Flash-enabled web browser, or via a smartphone or other device running special software.

=== Closure ===
Audiogalaxy stopped accepting registrations on December 12, 2012, due to the company's acquisition by Dropbox. Audiogalaxy discontinued service on January 31, 2013, and its website is no longer active.
