= Skoove =

Piano learning app

- Developer: Learnfield GmbH
- Initial release: 2015
- Operating system: iOS, Android
- Available in: English, German, Spanish, French, Japanese, Korean, Chinese
- Type: Piano learning app
- Website: https://www.skoove.com/

Skoove is a piano learning app developed by Berlin-based Learnfield GmbH. The app offers interactive piano courses catering to all skill levels, using AI and human expertise to provide personalized feedback and support during the learning process.

The Guardian and Spiegel described it as an effective and innovative tool for those learning to play the piano. Wired also highlighted its contribution to Berlin's thriving music tech scene.

== History ==
Skoove was launched by Learnfield GmbH, a Berlin-based company founded in 2014 by Florian Plenge and Stephan Schulz. It's Berlin's second most-popular piano-learning app, after flowkey, which was founded in 2015.

In 2015, the company participated in the Microsoft Ventures Accelerator, and launched Skoove on the web. The app was released on iOS in 2016, iPad in 2017, and Android in May 2021.

Skoove has also received several rounds of investment. In 2015, the company secured seed funding from High Tech Gründerfonds. This was followed by a venture capital funding round in 2017, which raised 1.2 million EUR from IBB Ventures and EGORA Ventures.

In 2019, additional investments totaling 2.9 million EUR were made by Ringier Digital Ventures, MGO Digital Ventures, and caparuca. The company is also supported by an EU grant through the Musical Instrument Learning Experience System (MILES).

== Overview ==
Skoove is a piano learning app that offers learning courses for beginners and advanced learners with a focus on empowering users to play independently. The app offers subscriptions and has some free content. The courses focus on key aspects of piano learning, such as music theory and sight-reading, as well as specific popular piano genres like pop and jazz. The app includes a diverse song library from classics to chart hits and uses AI to recognize the notes users play to provide real-time feedback. It is designed to connect to a piano either acoustically, via Bluetooth, or MIDI cable. The app is available in English, German, Spanish, French, Japanese, Korean, and Chinese languages.

== Reviews ==
In 2018, Skoove received the Gold Stevie Award for Best App – Education & References and the Silver Stevie Award for Startup of the Year.

In 2023, it was honored with the Deutsche Bildungs Award for Best Instrument E-Learning App.

Chip.de, a German computer magazine, reviewed Skoove as a useful tool for learning the piano without conventional lessons.
