= .ph =

Internet country code top-level domain for the Philippines

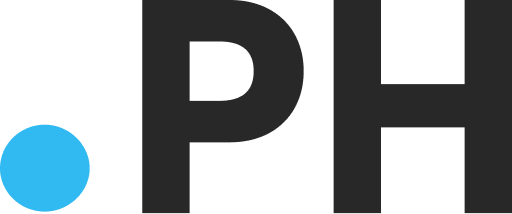
- Introduced: 14 September 1990
- TLD type: country code top-level domain
- Status: Active
- Registry: dotPH Domains Inc.
- Sponsor: PH Domain Foundation
- Intended use: Entities connected with the Philippines
- Actual use: Fairly popular in the Philippines; used by some as a domain hack such as Epitaph Records
- Registration restrictions: None in general; some specific subdomains (.gov.ph, .mil.ph, .edu.ph) have restrictions; domain names are written in basic Latin alphabet without diacritics only.
- Structure: Registration may be done at second level or at third level beneath generic-category 2nd level domains such as .com.ph
- Dispute policies: dotPH Dispute Resolution Process
- DNSSEC: Yes
- Registry website: www.dot.ph

.ph is the Internet country code top-level domain (ccTLD) for the Philippines.

The official domain registry of the .ph domain is dotPH Domains Inc. dotPH holds and maintains the database of PH domain names, specifically .ph, .com.ph, .net.ph, and .org.ph. Its domain name registrars are not only individuals, businesses, and organizations in the Philippines, but also those in other parts of the world.

The PH domain is currently administered by José Emmanuel "Joel" Disini, who is also dotPH's current CEO. Disini has been the domain administrator since Jon Postel assigned him the domain in 1990. The domain is sponsored by the PH Domain Foundation, a social outreach arm of dotPH which was also founded by Disini together with a group of IT professionals in August 1999.

In 1994, the administration of the .gov.ph domain was sub-delegated to the Government of the Philippines. In like manner, .edu.ph was sub-delegated to the Philippine Network Foundation, Inc. (PHNET).

Aside from being the registry, dotPH sells domains and web-related services such as web hosting, co-location, private registration and e-mail forwarding. dotPH also offers a free referral service which connects Small- and Medium-sized Enterprises with a network of over 300 accredited professional Filipino web designers. It formerly offered a free blogging service through .i.ph domains.

== History ==
=== Birth of the .ph registry ===
In 1989, Joel Disini founded the Email Company (EMC), one of the earliest Internet service providers in the Philippines. At that time most networks (including EMC) were connected to the Internet via UUCP. Disini's network had a UUCP connection to UUNET. This network connection, along with Disini's credentials as a Computer Science and Electrical Engineering graduate of Caltech and five-year experience in Macintosh Networking & Communications software development in Cupertino, California, became Jon Postel's basis for delegating the .ph domain to him. The .ph country code top-level domain was officially delegated on September 14, 1990. Since then, .ph domains have been commercially available to the public.

In 1994, the PHNET wide-area network, a project funded by DOST, completed its development and was able to connect the Philippines to the rest of the world by establishing TCP/IP connections to the U.S. using 64 kbit/s international leased lines.

At this point, the PHNET Foundation wanted to take over the administration of the .ph domain registry. Protracted negotiations took place, and eventually the responsibility of administrating the .edu.ph and .gov.ph domains were transferred to the PHNET Foundation and the Department of Science and Technology, respectively.

At that time domain fees ranged from Php 450 to Php 1,350. Domains registered during this period had no expiration and therefore had no renewal rates, thus the label lifetime domains. However, a fee was charged for modifications to these domains. Lifetime domains were non-transferable, and were only valid for the lifetime of the original Registrant.

=== PH Domain Foundation and dotPH ===
In August 1999 Disini and the technical people at EMC formed the PH Domain Foundation. It sought to promote the Internet and free unlimited email services in rural areas. It also took charge of the domain selling business and the management of the .ph domain registry.

On October 1, 1999, the PH Domain Foundation launched a fully automated online system for domain registration. It also launched a flat .ph domain space, enabling people to register domains like "domainname.ph". Lifetime domain registration was halted, and all domains registered after October 1 subsequently carried expiration dates. These domain owners had to pay a fee to renew their domains.

At around this period, the "for-profit" business and technical side of the PH Domain Foundation became identified as dotPH. Activities related to domains and the business were now attributed to dotPH, such as the resolution on the dispute between Yahoo! Philippines and another Philippine company, the launching of the automated online registration system, and even the administration of the .ph domain registry itself. To this day, dotPH is the official domain registry of the Philippines.

== Other developments ==
In 2000, dotPH developed a system called the Shared Registry System (SRS) which enabled domain name registrars and ISP's to manage domains and accept registrations on their own website by connecting to the dotPH registry backend. This is done by downloading and installing on their server a module that does the actual communication with the registry backend using an XML-based protocol.

dotPH also became one of the first Philippine websites to accept online credit card payments.

Through the years, dotPH has expanded its offerings to more than just domain names. Becoming a Google Cloud Partner in 2016 allowed dotPH to offer cloud and collaboration solutions in addition to services such as web hosting, SSL certificates and website builders.

dotPH currently uses the Extensible Provisioning Protocol (EPP), the most widely used protocol for communicating between Domain Registries and Registrars, to process domain registrations and renewals.
