= KickassTorrents =

Defunct file-sharing website

- Website type: Torrent directory, magnet links provider
- Available in: Multilingual (30+ languages, English primary language)
- Website: kickass.to; offline since July 2016
- Registration: Optional
- Users: Over 1 million per day (August 2015)
- Launched: November 2008; 18 years ago
- Current status: Offline

KickassTorrents (commonly abbreviated KAT) was a website that provided a directory for torrent files and magnet links to facilitate peer-to-peer file sharing using the BitTorrent protocol. It was founded in 2008 and by November 2014, KAT became the most visited BitTorrent directory in the world, overtaking The Pirate Bay, according to the site's Alexa ranking. KAT went offline on 20 July 2016 when the domain was seized by the U.S. government. The site's proxy servers were shut down by its staff at the same time.

In December 2016, former KAT staff members revived the KAT community by creating a website with its predecessor's features and appearance.

== History ==
KAT was initially launched in November 2008 at the domain name kickasstorrents.com. In April 2011, it moved to a Philippine domain kat.ph after a series of domain name seizures by the US Department of Justice against Demonoid and Torrentz. The site later moved across several different domains, which the operators planned to do every six months, including ka.tt, kickass.to, kickass.so, kickasstorrents.im and kat.cr.

In June 2016, KAT added an official Tor network .onion address.

=== Blocking and censorship ===
KickassTorrents on its website claimed that it complied with the DMCA and it removed infringing torrents reported by content owners.

On 28 February 2013, Internet service providers (ISPs) in the United Kingdom were ordered by the High Court in London to block access to KickassTorrents, along with two other torrent sites. Judge Richard Arnold ruled that the site's design contributed to copyright infringement. On 14 June, the domain name was changed to Tonga domain name kickass.to as a part of the site's regular domain change.

Later on 23 June, KAT was delisted from Google at the request of the MPAA. In late August 2013, KAT was blocked by Belgian ISPs. In January 2014, several Irish ISPs started blocking KAT, and in February, Twitter started blocking links to KAT, although this was stopped after a few days. In June 2014, KAT was blocked in Malaysia by the Communications and Multimedia Commission for violating copyright law.

In December 2014, the site moved to the Somalia domain name kickass.so, reportedly as a result of site's regular domain change. On 9 February 2015, kickass.so was listed as "banned" on Whois, causing the site to go offline. Later that day, the site reverted to its former domain name kickass.to. On 14 February 2015, it was found that messages mentioning "kickass.to" were blocked on Steam chat, but "kickass.so" and other popular torrent websites were not blocked, only flagged as "potentially malicious".

On 23 April 2015, the site moved to the Isle of Man-based domain kickasstorrents.im, but was taken down later that day, and on 24 April it was moved to the Costa Rica based domain name kat.cr. By July 2015, the kat.cr address had been removed from Google Search's results. After the removal, the top Google search result for KAT in many locations pointed to a fake KAT site that prompted visitors to download malware.

In October 2015, Portugal bypassed its courts by making a voluntary agreement between ISPs, rightsholders and the Ministry of Culture to block access to KAT and most of the other popular BitTorrent websites. The website had similarly been banned in India for copyright violations during that period. At the same time, Google Chrome and Mozilla Firefox blocked access to KAT because of security concerns with some of the ads pointing to malware. In April 2016, Google Chrome and Mozilla Firefox blocked KAT due to phishing concerns. Both blocks were later removed after KAT dealt with the concerns.

One of the main domains of the site went up for sale in August 2016.

=== Arrest of the alleged owner ===
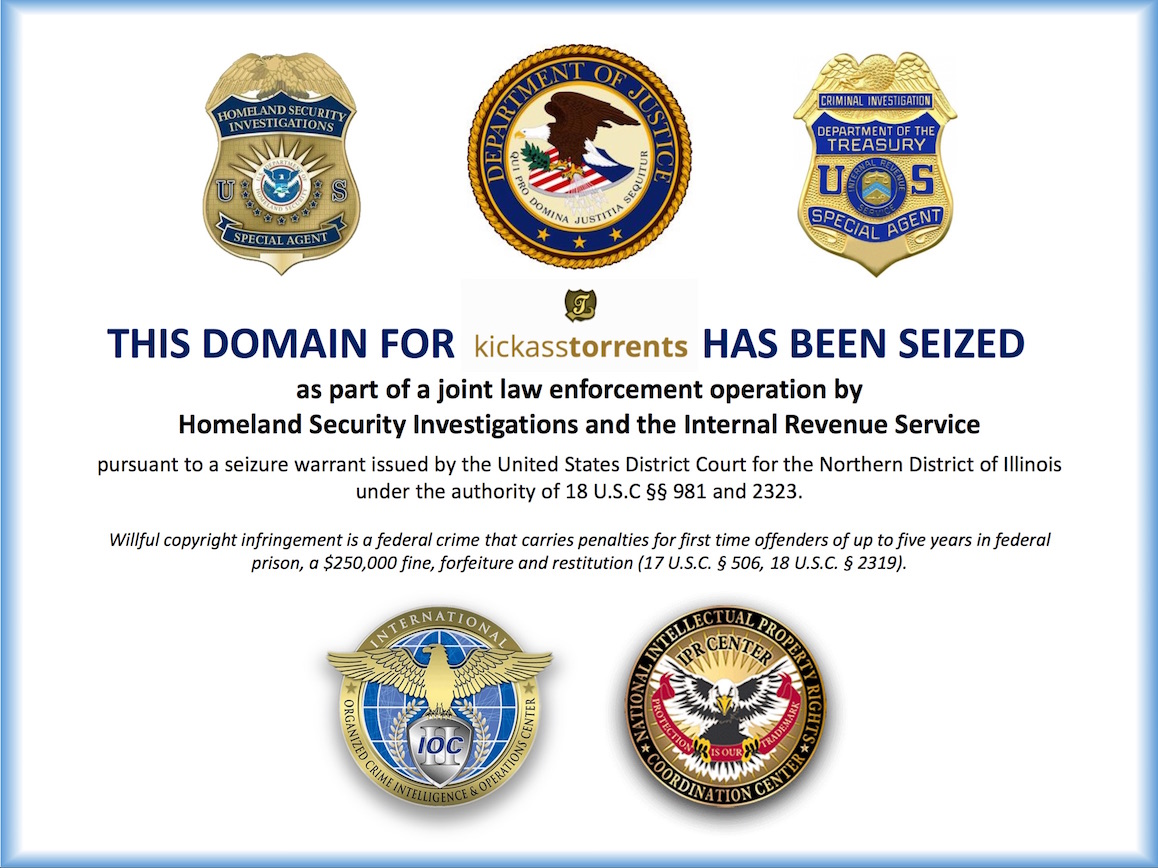
Notice displayed on KickassTorrents sites after its seizure

On 20 July 2016, the United States Department of Justice announced that it had seized the KAT.cr domain and had identified its alleged owner. Artem Vaulin (Ukrainian: Артем Ваулін), a 30-year-old Ukrainian man known online as "tirm", was detained in Poland after being charged with a four-count U.S. criminal indictment. The remaining domains were taken offline voluntarily after the KAT.cr domain name was seized. Following the seizure of the original KAT domain multiple unofficial mirrors have been put online. These have no connection to the original team who have been urging users to exercise caution. A number of these mirrors have since been taken down.

An investigation led by special agent Jared Der-Yeghiayan culminated in the arrest of Vaulin after investigators cross-referenced an IP address he used for an iTunes transaction with an IP address used to log into KAT's Facebook page. The FBI also posed as an advertiser and obtained details of a bank account associated with the site.

The criminal complaint, filed in the United States District Court for the Northern District of Illinois by Homeland Security Investigations, stated that authorities were in possession of full copies of KAT's hard drives, including its email server. Investigators suggested that KAT made over $12 million per year in advertising revenue.

In late August 2016, the Department of Justice followed the complaint with a full grand jury indictment of Vaulin and two other defendants, Ievgen Kutsenko and Oleksandr Radostin; while Vaulin was still being held in a Polish prison. Vaulin obtained both Polish and US legal representation, the latter in the person of Ira Rothken. In November 2016, a Polish appeals court refused to allow bail for Vaulin, stating the evidence provided by the US is sufficient to keep him in prison.

In December 2016, Artem Vaulin was transferred from prison to a hospital due to severe back problems. While the court initially ruled that his condition did not warrant hospitalization, the prison director later authorized the transfer to ensure that he received proper medical care. Doctors diagnosed him with partial paralysis and a loss of sensation in his lower limb and concluded that surgery was necessary. His medical condition has led to the postponement of several pending extradition hearings.

In February 2017, the Warsaw District Court of first instance approved the extradition of Artem Vaulin to the United States. This decision marked the first stage of the extradition process, which includes a review by two judicial instances before the final decision is made by the Minister of Justice. Meanwhile, Vaulin remained hospitalized and under medical treatment for severe back problems.

On May 18, 2017, Vaulin was released on bail on medical grounds, with the bail set at $108,000. As part of the conditions of his release, he was prohibited from leaving the country, and his passport was confiscated. After leaving jail, Vaulin moved to a rented apartment in Warsaw with his wife and five-year-old son, pending a decision by the second instance court in the ongoing extradition proceedings.

In late 2020, Artem Vaulin violated the conditions of his release by unexpectedly leaving Poland, and his whereabouts became unknown. As a result, the District Court in Warsaw forfeited his bail on August 26, 2020, and extradition proceedings in Poland were discontinued. After losing contact with Vaulin, his legal team in the United States withdrew from the case, and the United States District Court for the Northern District of Illinois decided to suspend the proceedings until the defendant was apprehended.

=== Revival ===
In mid-December 2016, some of the former KAT staff and moderators launched a website with a similar appearance as the original under the domain katcr.co. The site has been offline since July 2020.
