= IsoHunt =

Torrent index site closed 2013

isoHunt

- isoHunt logo and homepage
- Website type: Torrent index
- Available in: English
- Owner: isoHunt Inc. (Gary Fung)
- Creator: Gary Fung
- Revenue: Online advertising Donations; Paid membership
- Website: isohunt.com
- Commercial: No
- Registration: Optional; mandatory for uploading
- Launched: January 2003; 23 years ago
- Current status: Offline^{[α]}
- Content license: Free access
- ^{α} Functional clones have been created by others

isoHunt was an online torrent files index and repository, where visitors could browse, search, download or upload torrents of various digital content of mostly entertainment nature. The website was taken down in October 2013 as a result of a legal action from the MPAA; by the end of October 2013 however, two sites with content presumably mirrored from isohunt.com were reported in media. One of them – isohunt.to – became a de facto replacement of the original site. It is not associated in any way with the old staff or owners of the site, and is to be understood as a separate continuation.

It originated in 2003 as isohunt.com website for IRC files search and reached over 13.7 million torrents in its database and 20 million peers from indexed torrents. With 7.4 million unique visitors as of May 2006, isoHunt was one of the most popular BitTorrent search engines. Thousands of torrents were added to and deleted from it every day. Users of isoHunt performed over 40 million unique searches per month. On October 19, 2008, isoHunt passed the 1 petabyte mark for torrents indexed globally. The site was the third most popular BitTorrent site as of 2008. According to isoHunt, the total amount of shared content was more than 14.11 petabytes as of June 13, 2012.

The site came to an end when the legal battles that isoHunt's founder had been in for years with conglomerates of IP rights holders over allegations of copyright infringing came to a head. A settlement with the MPAA was reached in 2013, stipulating a $110 million reimbursement for damages and the site's closure that followed on October 21, 2013.

== History ==
isoHunt was founded in January 2003 by Gary Fung, a Canadian national. Its name is derived from the term ISO image, used to describe a 1:1 soft copy of a disk (typically a CD or DVD).

On February 23, 2006, the Motion Picture Association of America (MPAA) issued a press release stating they were suing isoHunt for copyright infringement.

On September 2, 2009, isoHunt announced the launch of a spinoff site, hexagon.cc. The goal of hexagon.cc was to have a place for social groups based on certain niches to share specific content relevant to their interests. It is down until further notice.

In early 2010, users in the US and along south eastern Canada were redirected to a stripped-down version called isoHunt Lite in order to remove some of the factors that were used in determining liability for infringement; however, full access was restored in early 2012.

The website was banned in India in 2012 for copyright violations, this led to incidents of hacking activism by Anonymous demanding its unblocking along with other websites which had been blocked.

In October 2013 Isohunt announced it would shut down indefinitely. After years of court battles over copyright infringement with the MPAA, Isohunt agreed to a settlement. Under the terms of the settlement Isohunt will shut down the site, and close three other sites that redirect to the Isohunt domain: Podtropolis, TorrentBox, and Edtk-it.com. Fung also agreed to pay $110 million in damages.

The site was shut down on October 21, 2013, two days earlier than originally planned, leaving a farewell message from Gary Fung that also explained that the rush was to prevent backup activity – possibly the one reported to have been started by ArchiveTeam.

== Legal ==
=== Correspondence with the MPAA ===
Selected items of email correspondence between Gary Fung and the MPAA have been posted on isoHunt.com.

=== Lawsuit ===
In February 2006, it was announced that the MPAA had launched legal proceedings against isoHunt, TorrentBox, TorrentSpy, ed2k-it, and several other BitTorrent indexing or tracker sites, alleging that these sites facilitate copyright infringement. On February 28, 2006, a lawsuit was filed against Gary Fung in the United States District Court for the Southern District of New York. Fung stands to oppose the MPAA on legal grounds. On August 18, 2006, Judge Stanton granted a motion for case transfer from New York to California on the grounds of inconvenienced parties and similar cases already filed in the District Court of Central California.

On December 21, 2009, the court granted the MPAA's motion for summary judgment, finding isoHunt and Fung liable for copyright infringement on the theory of inducement. The MPAA had presented evidence showing that the majority of content linked to on IsoHunt was infringing content, that the search engine was tuned to assist users in finding infringing works, and that Fung himself had made remarks suggesting the purpose of the site was to allow users to download infringing content. The court found that IsoHunt had not presented any satisfactory evidence to counter these claims, and at its core it was merely an "evolutionary modification" of Napster and Grokster, two P2P systems that had previously been held liable for inducing copyright infringement.

As a result, the court went on to issue a permanent injunction prohibiting IsoHunt to continue indexing and linking to infringing content. The case on appeal, dubbed Columbia Pictures Industries, Inc. v. Fung, upheld the district court's findings on copyright infringement, but found that the injunction was overly burdensome to the extent it could prevent Fung from seeking legitimate employment, as certain provisions in the injunction would have prevented Fung from working in any technology company whose services could be used to infringe copyrighted content even if those companies were not engaged in copyright infringement.

=== DMCA takedown notices ===
IsoHunt has a history of complying with DMCA takedown notices, and has worked with various copyright owners in the past, such as the RIAA and Microsoft. The site uses an ex-gratia takedown process modelled on the DMCA, even though the servers were relocated to Canada in January 2007 where the DMCA does not apply.

=== Lawsuit against the CRIA ===
On September 8, 2008, Gary Fung announced on the isoHunt front page that he had made a preemptive move against an impending lawsuit from the CRIA by filing a petition to the Supreme Court of British Columbia. Fung argues that isoHunt is merely a search engine to find torrents that are scattered around the web, much the same as Google or any other search engine can be used in the same way.

=== Internet service providers ===
On January 16, 2007, isoHunt was taken off-line, stating "Lawyers from our primary ISP decided to pull our plug without any advance notice". After a major hardware upgrade, the site resumed normal operation by January 22, 2007, although experiencing several brief periods of subsequent downtime due to server changes.

On July/August 2013, Federation of the Italian Music Industry obtained an order from the Court of Milan which demands Internet service providers (ISPs) to block isoHunt's domain and IP address.

=== Shutdown as part of settlement with MPAA ===
On October 17, 2013, Variety.com announced the website isoHunt would shut down by Oct. 23, 2013, as part of a settlement in a massive copyright infringement suit filed by Hollywood studios, agreeing to pay $110 million for claims that the site induced the violation of copyrighted movies and TV shows although isoHunt never hosted such content. The settlement terms included a $110 million judgment against isoHunt and its owner, Gary Fung, ending a seven-year legal battle over its operations. According to court documents cited by the BBC, Fung's company will likely be able to pay only between two and four million dollars though. The site shut down on 21 October 2013, 2 days earlier than the announced date, leaving a note from Gary Fung and a link to a YouTube "trailer for the movie Terminator Salvation" that is actually a Rickroll.

Initiating Self Destruct

This is it. We are shutting down isoHunt services a little early. I'm told there was this Internet archival team that wants to make historical copy of our .torrent files, I'm honoured that people thinks our site is worthy of historical preservation, but the truth is about 95% of those .torrent files can be found off Google regardless and mostly have been indexed from other BitTorrent sites in the first place. So I might as well do a proper send-off to you dear isoHunt users, before final shutdown sequence on Tuesday. It's been an adventure in the last 10.5 years working on isoHunt, a privilege working with some of the smartest guys I've worked with, and my life won't be the same without it. For what I'm working on next, please look up my blog on Google and follow me there. Because as the Terminator would say with a German accent,

I'll be backkk.

— Gary Fung

== Technical details ==
In the beginning of 2007, isoHunt restructured its server setup and bought mostly new hardware for the cluster that operates the site. The cluster had a total of 34 AMD Opteron cores, 70 GB in RAM and 30 hard drives ranging from SATAs to 15,000 rpm SCSIs.

The network started with a D-Link switch but due to multiple failures, isoHunt moved to a Force10 switch. IsoHunt was uplinked through Neutral Data Centers Corp to a mix of bandwidth providers.

== IsoHunt clones ==
Isohunt.to
- Isohunt.to uses logo of original isoHunt
- Website type: Torrent index
- Available in: English
- Owner: anonymous
- Creator: anonymous
- Revenue: Online advertising Donations
- Website: isohunt.to oldpiratebay.org^{[α]}
- Commercial: No
- Registration: Optional; mandatory for uploading
- Launched: October 2013; 13 years ago
- Current status: Online
- Content license: Free access
- ^{α} Taken offline when The Pirate Bay came online in Jan 2015

On October 30, 2013, two weeks following the shutdown of the original website, a group of people claiming to be dedicated to isoHunt's continuance brought a near-identical clone of the original website online, accessible via isohunt.to. Former staff member of original isoHunt has made it clear that the team behind isohunt.com has not been involved in any way in 'resurrection' of isoHunt.

Another site, isohunt.ee, has also been reported to be an unauthorized clone of the original site.

ArchiveTeam have stated that they are not affiliated with any mirrors of isoHunt. Parts of the site they managed to preserve were uploaded to Internet Archive.

== OldPirateBay.org and The Open Bay ==
=== OldPirateBay.org ===
On December 13, 2014, just 4 days after a raid by Swedish police took ThePirateBay.se offline, the isoHunt.to team launched a new website, OldPirateBay.org, mirroring the contents of a recent snapshot of The Pirate Bay. It is branded in isoHunt's style, featuring both a ghostly blue theme and the isoHunt logo. The team stated that they would gladly take their copy of the site down if and when the original Pirate Bay came back online, which occurred on January 31, 2015.

=== The Open Bay ===
On December 19, 2014, isoHunt.to released a tool called The Open Bay at Openbay.isohunt.to, providing original source code and additional tools in order to allow users to deploy their own version of The Pirate Bay website.

== See also ==
- Comparison of BitTorrent sites
- Demonoid
- International Intellectual Property Alliance
- Peer-to-peer file sharing
