= UMG Recordings, Inc. v. MP3.com, Inc. =

Landmark case of the U.S. District Court for the Southern District of New York

- Court: United States District Court for the Southern District of New York
- Full case name: UMG Recordings, Inc. v. MP3.com, Inc.
- Decided: April 28, 2000
- Docket nos.: 1:00-cv-00472
- Citation: 92 F. Supp. 2d 349 (S.D.N.Y. 2000)

Holding
- Distribution of legitimately purchased music files via the Internet entails the creation of copies that require authorization under U.S. copyright law.

Court membership
- Judge sitting: Jed S. Rakoff

Keywords
- Copyright, Fair Use, Transformative use

UMG Recordings, Inc. v. MP3.com, Inc., 92 F. Supp. 2d 349 (S.D.N.Y. 2000) was a landmark case of the U.S. District Court for the Southern District of New York concerning the unauthorized copying of copyrighted materials on the Internet. The case concerned unauthorized duplication by the company MP3.com of songs from a wide selection of compact discs for the purposes of launching a service that allowed users to access their private music collections online from anywhere in the world. This business model was ruled to be a violation of American copyright law.

== Background ==
Upon the rise of music file sharing by consumers on the Internet, MP3.com conceived a new service in early 2000 called My.MP3.com that allowed users to rip songs from compact discs that they had already purchased legitimately, then upload the resulting MP3 files to an account managed by MP3.com. The users would then be able to log into their accounts from any Internet-connected device anywhere in the world, and listen to the music that they had previously uploaded. Users quickly compiled a library of over 80,000 albums, with the songs stored on servers at MP3.com. The company also attempted to expand the library by buying tens of thousands of albums on compact disc itself, and adding those to the library to be accessed by its users.

To use the service, the My.MP3.com subscriber had to "confirm" that they had legitimately purchased the CD by placing it in their computer's CD drive while logged in to My.MP3.com, thus allowing a purchase code to be recorded by the service. A subscriber could also purchase a CD from one of MP3.com's cooperating online retailers. Despite this process, the record companies argued that MP3.com had made few efforts to ensure that the songs being uploaded by its users had in fact been legitimately purchased in CD form.

Eleven different record companies, with UMG Recordings serving as the lead plaintiff, sued MP3.com for failing to secure permission for copies of songs that were created automatically when users uploaded ripped songs to the company's servers. MP3.com argued that the owners of compact discs were entitled to make copies of copyrighted songs that they had purchased legitimately, and give them to any selected party (including an online service) per the fair use defense in American copyright law, as well as the first sale doctrine. MP3.com also claimed that its business plan helped the record industry by enabling music fans to enjoy their purchased music outside of the home.

MP3.com also argued that a copied MP3 file suffered from lesser audio fidelity and lower quality than the equivalent song on a compact disc, so the files in its My.MP3.com library constituted transformative use under copyright law. MP3.com also accused the record companies of copyright misuse by filing a lawsuit for purposes of revenge, while its subscribers were simply engaged in space shifting – consuming their purchased media in different environments – which had been upheld by several Supreme Court precedents.

== Opinion of the court ==
As stated by Judge Jed S. Rakoff in his opinion: “The complex marvels of cyberspatial communication may create difficult legal issues, but not in this case.” Rakoff rejected arguments by MP3.com that its service merely allowed listeners to practice space shifting, stating that "stripped to its essence, defendant's 'consumer protection' argument amounts to nothing more than a bold claim that defendant should be able to misappropriate plaintiff's property simply because there is a consumer demand for it. This hardly appeals to the conscience of equity."

Rakoff also ruled that given recent advances in computing technology and the playback devices used by the typical music consumer, an MP3 file was not substantially different in quality from a compact disc, so a ripped file does not qualify as transformative use under copyright law, while MP3.com's claim that it was protecting or enhancing the music industry was rejected because the service infringed on the companies' distribution rights.

== Impact ==
With this decision, the court drew a distinction between traditional space shifting, which had previously been allowed for video cassettes and other physical media, and "virtual" space shifting as practiced by My.MP3.com. This type of virtual space shifting required the creation of a copy at the MP3.com servers, which in turn required authorization from the copyright owners under copyright law.

UMG Recordings, Inc. v. MP3.com, Inc. was cited at the time as an important decision in the then-burgeoning practice of file sharing and the trading of unauthorized music and media files on the Internet. However, some scholars argued that the ruling only addressed the specific business model practiced by My.MP3.com, and left larger file sharing trends on the Internet unaddressed, particularly those practices not covered by a legitimate (if unsuccessful) business plan. The ruling also neglected to address any responsibilities that the legacy record companies may or may not have had in the management of their own copyrighted products and preventing them from being illegally traded.

This ruling resulted in several additional legal claims against MP3.com, with the company ultimately owing more than $150 million to legacy record companies. The judgments pushed MP3.com into severe financial difficulties which were averted by a merger with Vivendi Universal.
