= MP3.com =

Defunct music website

- Website type: Music
- Dissolved: c. April 2024; 2 years ago
- Owners: Vivendi Universal (2001–2003); CNET (2003–2008); CBS Interactive (2008–2019); Paramount Global (2019–2024)
- Creator: Michael Robertson
- Commercial: Yes
- Registration: Optional
- Launched: December 17, 1997; 28 years ago
- Current status: Defunct

MP3.com was a website operated by Paramount Global publishing tabloid-style news items about digital music and artists, songs, services, and technologies. It is better known for its original incarnation as a legal, free music-sharing service, named after the popular music file format MP3, popular with independent musicians for promoting their work. That service was shut down on December 2, 2003, by CNET, which, after purchasing the domain name (but not MP3.com's technology or music assets), established the current MP3.com site.

== Original version ==
=== History ===
MP3.com was co-founded in December 1997 by Michael Robertson and Greg Flores, as part of Z Company. Z Company ran a variety of websites: filez.com, websitez.com, and sharepaper.com, purchased from Lars Matthiassen.

The idea to purchase the MP3.com domain arose when Flores was monitoring search traffic on filez.com, a FTP search site whose first incarnation provided an easy-to-use graphical interface for searching for various types of files including software, graphics, video, and audio. The first version of files utilized an existing free search engine developed by graduate students (led by Tor Egge, who later founded Fast Search and Transfer based on this search engine) at the Norwegian University of Science and Technology. Flores noticed in his review of the search logs that people were searching for "mp3".

Robertson told Flores to search for a site that was working with legitimate MP3 information and see if that company would be interested in working with them. Robertson e-mailed the then-owner of MP3.com, Martin Paul, to purchase the URL. The business plan was to use MP3.com to drive more search queries to Filez.com, the source of most of the company revenue at the time. Filez.com's free search results contained pay-for-placement click-through results. MP3.com received over 18,000 unique users in the first 24 hours of making the URL live, and Flores received his first advertising purchase call within 18 hours of launch. The resulting advertising purchase and traffic caused the team to re-direct focus to MP3.com.

In 1998, the National Academy of Recording Arts and Sciences (NARAS) refused to run an ad that MP3.com had purchased for inclusion in NARAS's Grammy Magazine. The ad said, "What the whole world listens to…Future Grammy winners found here". NARAS's reason for pulling the ad was "the limited number of advertising positions available in the magazine in conjunction with the somewhat controversial nature of your product."

Cox Interactive Media invested $45 million and acquired 10% of MP3.com in June 1999. A few months later, the two companies launched mp3radio.com, a joint project intended to create mini-websites to offer MP3 downloads, concert tickets, and, eventually, CD sales to listeners of Cox's terrestrial radio stations.

MP3.com went public on July 21, 1999, and raised over $370 million, at the time, the single largest technology IPO to date. The stock was offered at $28 per share, rose to $105 per share during the day, and closed at $63.3125.

In its heyday, MP3.com was the Internet home to many independent musicians, each of whom had an individual web presence at the URL www.mp3.com/*name-of-act*. At the end of 1999, MP3.com launched a promotion that allowed these artists to monetize their content on the site. Called "Pay for Play" or P4P, it used an algorithm to pay each MP3.com artist based on the number of streams and downloads of their songs.

Artists provided 96 hours of audio content per day from the summer of 1999 to the summer of 2003: about one song per minute or 16 listening years of audio content over four years. A staff of trained music experts reviewed all content before publication to prevent uploads of unlicensed materials.

Alanis Morissette was an early investor in the site after it sponsored one of her tours. She owned nearly 400,000 shares in the company which she sold off through a series of U.S. Securities and Exchange Commission (SEC) filings in late 1999 and early 2000. Her holdings and profit from the venture were $3.4 million at her exit.

At its peak, MP3.com delivered over 4 million MP3 formatted audio files per day to over 800,000 unique users on a customer base of 25 million registered users – about 4 terabytes of data delivery per month from three data centers. Engineers at MP3.com designed and built the Pressplay infrastructure, later purchased by Roxio on May 19, 2003, which they used as a base to relaunch Napster. MP3.com also managed eMusic, Rollingstone.com and Vivendi Universal music properties. MP3.com engineering developed their own content delivery network and data warehousing technologies handling seven terabytes of customer profile information.

=== Infrastructure ===
The technology infrastructure at MP3.com consisted of over 1500 simple Intel-based servers running Red Hat Linux (versions 5.2–7.2) in load-balanced clusters in data centers run by AT&T, Worldcom and the now defunct Exodus Communications. It was one of the first massively scalable Internet architectures for media delivery. The software of choice was C, Perl, Apache, Squid, MySQL some Oracle and Sybase. This architecture routinely pushed 1.2 Gbit/s total traffic globally.

=== My.MP3.com ===
A screenshot of the service

On January 12, 2000, MP3.com launched the "My.MP3.com" service which enabled users to securely register their CDs and then stream digital copies online from the My.MP3.com service. Since consumers could only listen online to music they already proved they owned the company saw this as a great opportunity for revenue by allowing fans to access their music online. The record industry did not see it that way and sued MP3.com claiming that the service constituted unauthorized duplication and promoted copyright infringement.

Judge Jed S. Rakoff, in the case UMG v. MP3.com, ruled in favor of the record labels against MP3.com and the service on the copyright law provision of "making mechanical copies for commercial use without permission from the copyright owner." Before damage was awarded, MP3.com settled with the plaintiff, UMG Recordings, for $53.4 million, in exchange for the latter's permission to use its entire music collection. Later, the firm no longer had sufficient funds to weather the technology downturn. MP3.com was subsequently bought and the new owner did not continue the same service.

=== MP3.com sold ===
Weakened financially, MP3.com was eventually acquired by Vivendi Universal, the then-owner of Universal Studios, Sierra Entertainment, Blizzard Entertainment and Knowledge Adventure in May 2001 at $5 per share ($23 below the IPO share price) or approximately $372 million in cash and stock. Jean-Marie Messier, then-CEO of Vivendi Universal, stated "The acquisition of MP3.com was an extremely important step in our strategy to create both a distribution platform and acquire state-of-the-art technology. MP3.com will be a great asset to Vivendi Universal in meeting our goal of becoming the leading online provider of music and related services."

Vivendi Universal had difficulties growing the service and eventually dismantled the original site, selling off all of its assets including the URL and logo to CNET in 2003.

E-mails to MP3.com artists and a placeholder message at MP3.com announced that CNET would be coming up with replacement services in the future, based on its current download.com facilities.

A business unit of MP3.com, Trusonic, which provides background music and messaging services to retailers, acquired licenses with 250,000 artists representing 1.7 million songs. Trusonic partnered with GarageBand.com to revive these artist accounts. Trusonic retained most of the software technology developed at MP3.com and exists today as part of the Mood Media organization.

On March 25, 2009, MP3.com announced in an editor blog entry that they would begin redirecting all of their artist pages and categories to Last.fm.
