= TorrentSpy =

Torrent indexing website

- Website type: Torrent index
- Website: TorrentSpy.com
- Registration: Optional
- Current status: Closed

TorrentSpy was a popular BitTorrent indexing website. It provided .torrent files, which enabled users to exchange data between one another.

It also provided a forum to comment on them and integrated the user-driven content site ShoutWire into the front page. In August 2007, there were more than 1,000,000 torrents indexed with thousands of new torrents indexed every day.

The Motion Picture Association of America filed a lawsuit in February 2006 for TorrentSpy facilitating copyright infringement as many torrents on its site were linking to copyrighted films. In December 2007 the court ruled against TorrentSpy.

On March 24, 2008, facing further fines for not cooperating with the court, TorrentSpy shut itself down.

== History ==
In February 2006, the MPAA filed lawsuits against TorrentSpy, isoHunt, and others for "abusing technology to facilitate infringement of copyrighted works."

On May 29, 2007, A United States federal judge ordered that TorrentSpy begin monitoring its users' activities and to submit these logs to the Motion Picture Association of America. The TorrentSpy attorney, Ira Rothken, stated that TorrentSpy would rather deny access to U.S. users before it started monitoring anyone, since such monitoring is in violation of TorrentSpy's own privacy policy.

In August 2007, TorrentSpy began denying access to United States users and international users using US-based ISPs. In response, the MPAA filed documents calling TorrentSpy's denial of access "another illegitimate attempt by defendants to evade authority of this court and the May 29 order", and asking for sanctions. The ability for users to make comments on individual torrents was also disabled at this time.

In October 2007, a former TorrentSpy associate, Robert Anderson, said that the MPAA paid him $15,000 for inside information about the website. He was also able to hack into TorrentSpy's e-mail system and hand over confidential information to the MPAA. Even though MPAA admitted in the court having bought the inside e-mails, justice ruled that they contained no business secrets, nor that there would have been anything illegal in the procedure.

TorrentSpy after the shutdown.

On March 24, 2008, TorrentSpy's servers were shut down, shortly after a message was posted commenting on the end of TorrentSpy:

"Friends of TorrentSpy,

We have decided on our own, not due to any court order or agreement, to bring the Torrentspy.com search engine to an end and thus we permanently closed down worldwide on March 24, 2008.
The legal climate in the USA for copyright, privacy of search requests, and links to torrent files in search results is simply too hostile. We spent the last two years, and hundreds of thousands of dollars, defending the rights of our users and ourselves.
Ultimately the Court demanded actions that in our view were inconsistent with our privacy policy, traditional court rules, and International law; therefore, we now feel compelled to provide the ultimate method of privacy protection for our users - permanent shutdown.

It was a wild ride,

The TorrentSpy Team"

'Big Brother in the form of an increasingly powerful government and in an increasingly powerful private sector will pile the records high with reasons why privacy should give way to national security, to law and order [...] and the like.' - Justice William O. Douglas"

On May 7, 2008, a federal judge ordered TorrentSpy to pay the Motion Picture Association of America $110 million for alleged infringement of thousands of copyrighted film and TV shows. In a four-page final ruling, U.S. District Court Judge Florence-Marie Cooper entered the multimillion-dollar judgement against TorrentSpy parent company Valence Media as terminating sanctions for destroying User IP Address evidence related to the case. Cooper also issued a permanent injunction against the Web site. "This substantial money judgment sends a strong message about the illegality of these sites," MPAA chairman and CEO Dan Glickman said. "The demise of TorrentSpy is a clear victory for the studios." Whether the MPAA will collect the $110 million from TorrentSpy remains to be seen.

== See also ==
- BitTorrent
- Peer-to-peer file sharing
- isoHunt
- Torrent Search Engine
- Bitcomet
- Peekvid
- Showstash
