= Torrentz =

BitTorrent metasearch engine

- Torrentz website and screenshot for a selected torrent.
- Website type: Torrent meta-search engine
- Available in: English
- Dissolved: 5 August 2016
- Headquarters: {{{location_country}}}
- Area served: Worldwide
- Creator: Flippy (alias)
- Website: torrentz.eu (.com until April 2011)
- Commercial: No
- Registration: Optional
- Launched: 15 July 2003; 23 years ago
- Current status: Offline

Torrentz was a Finland-based metasearch engine for BitTorrent, run by an individual known as Flippy and founded on 24 July 2003. It indexed torrents from various major torrent websites and offered compilations of various trackers per torrent that were not necessarily present in the default .torrent file, so that when a tracker was down, other trackers could do the work. It was the second most popular torrent website in 2012.

== Usage ==
Torrentz's user interface was simple; it had only a user menu and a search panel. Users were not required to register before searching files.

To perform a search, users would simply type in a string of keywords within the autocomplete-enabled search field and execute the search by either pressing the search button in the UI or the enter key on the keyboard. From there, a list of matching torrent files were displayed on the screen for the user to choose from. This list could be filtered by size, age (one day, three days, one week or one month) and by "safety & quality" ("any", "good" or "verified"). The "good" filter was applied by default, and "verified" was reserved for torrents uploaded by well-known groups.

Selecting a torrent from the search results list would take the user to another page listing the websites currently hosting the specified torrent (with which users would download files). As Torrentz used meta-search engines, users would be redirected to other torrent sites to download content (commonly KickassTorrents, which was considered safe to use).

== History ==
In November 2008 scammers using fake papers attempted to take over the torrentz.com domain. As a backup, the site administrator set up the domain torrentz.eu. After 18 December 2010, torrentz.eu became the site's default domain, due to the domain name seizures carried out by US authorities on various torrent websites.

In 2013, Paramount Pictures sent a DMCA claim to Google to remove the Torrentz homepage and two other pages from its search engine. Torrentz counter-claimed on this request, claiming that the links did not infringe any copyright policies.

On 26 May 2014, Torrentz had its domain name suspended without a court order following a request from the Police Intellectual Property Crime Unit. A day later, the suspension of torrentz.eu was lifted. The website had three alternative domains (.me, .ch and .in) and hoped to move the .eu domain to a new registrar. All of these domains have since been blocked within the UK by Sky. The website had similarly been banned in India in 2012 for copyright violations, this led to incidents of hacking activism by Anonymous demanding the unblocking of Torrentz and other websites which had been blocked.

On 5 August 2016, Torrentz was shut down by its operators with the message "Torrentz will always love you. Farewell." displayed; it operated for over 13 years.

== Clones ==
In August 2016, a few days after Torrentz shut down, an unofficial clone of Torrentz - Torrentz2.eu - was launched that initially indexed 60 million torrents. Later that month, another unofficial clone - torrentzeu.to - was launched that initially indexed 30 million torrents. At the end of June 2020, the torrentz2.eu domain was shut down but the backup domain torrentz2.is remained accessible. Since November 2020, torrentz2.is and its mirror pages return a "503 error" to its visitors, although its .onion domain remains functional.

== See also ==
- Comparison of BitTorrent sites
- List of websites blocked in the United Kingdom
- Internet censorship in Australia
