= ShareReactor =

- Website type: web portal for the eDonkey network and Torrent files
- Available in: English; Forum contains multiple language sections
- Owner: The Pirate Bay
- Website: ShareReactor.com
- Launched: August 5, 2001; 25 years ago
- Current status: Closed

ShareReactor was an index site for files on the eDonkey network and Torrent files. ShareReactor did not host any files; instead, the links it contained were accessible through an eDonkey network and BitTorrent client. The site was taken down by Swiss Police on March 10, 2004, due to the suspicion of breach of copyright and trademark laws. After a long downtime of nearly two years and six months, the site returned online under new ownership. However nearly two months after its return it once again closed down due to lack of popularity. In December 2008 the site was reopened once more brought back to life with help from the Pirate Bay team. Its notability is still known today as a search on any p2p network will show many thousands of files tagged with Sharereactor in their name.

ShareReactor delivers links that can be used together with a P2P client program that understands eD2k links or torrent files.

== Origin ==
The site was founded on August 5, 2001, by Geraldine Arlington using the pseudonym 'Gowenna'. The site was initially located at Gowenna.da.ru, which was only a shadow domain. The site was renamed ShareReactor in November 2001 and used an official domain due to its great popularity. In January 2002, it was announced that Gowenna had died in a car accident due to icy road conditions. The site administration was continued by Christian Riesen (a.k.a. Simon Moon) who programmed the system and was responsible for technical work on the site and hosting. The site's popularity persisted, eventually even growing further. ShareReactor remained the top eD2k indexing website up until March 2004 when it suddenly was closed due to suspicion of breach of copyright and trademark laws within the country of Switzerland where ShareReactor's owner lived and where ShareReactor was being hosted.

== Takedown ==
ShareReactor was taken down by the local police in the Canton of Thurgau, Switzerland on March 10, 2004, due to the suspicion of breach of copyright and trademark laws. The investigation was reportedly initiated by complaints from the Swiss Anti-Piracy-Federation (SAFE) at the request of several large corporations, one of them presumably being Columbia Tri-Star Inc.

== Reopening and Closure ==
ShareReactor came back online after nearly two years and six months of being offline. Before ShareReactor's full return in September 2006, ShareReactor made a partial return, which was in June 2004 when their forum was put back online. However the difference was all the sections of the forum that featured eD2k links were closed due to the request they received a few months before. The return of ShareReactor's forum was until around November 2004 when the place that was hosting the forum had a major power surge and the servers were destroyed. On the last known occasion of ShareReactor's forum being online, there were around 1,100,000 posts.

When ShareReactor made a full return was on September 4, 2006. Prior to their reopening, a mass e-mail was sent to all the users of ShareReactor and users of related sites, such as RespectP2P. ShareReactor was back although things were a bit different: the site was under new ownership, had a new design, and featured better controls within the website. A noticeable difference was the site owner and administrator, SimonMoon, who ran the site from January 2002 until March 2004 choose not to be involved within the site since it was still under investigation. The database used for the homepage was a backup taken on March 10, 2004 (the day of ShareReactor's closure), and the forum database was from a backup taken on December 29, 2002 (about one year and three months prior to the closure). When ShareReactor's forum returned, there were only around 420,000 posts, which means a loss of 680,000 posts. Very few staff members of ShareReactor were active when the site reopened, the staff were: XTRiCiAN, Maxaiqa, Piratsvin, Seth, and sUiZiD. Prior to ShareReactor being closed down, there was a staff of about twenty administrators and thirty-five forum moderators, a significant amount compared to when ShareReactor reopened.

In late October 2006, ShareReactor closed down once again. The closure was due to lack of popularity within the site. In February 2008 a Swiss district court finally sentenced the prior owner of Sharereactor to a fine of 2,000 CHF ( US$1,827.11 ) nearly four years after the website was first shut down by the authorities.

== The Second Reopening ==
On December 17, 2008, the site reopened once again as a combined eDonkey and BitTorrent site, this time affiliated with The Pirate Bay which hosts the site and tracks the torrents. The focus is to offer the newest content as torrent files but also keep the library of eD2k links up to date. The current site team has made roughly a third of the site releases. The forums run on backups which dates back to 2002. According to a post by the Sharereactor team and Alexa, the site is continuing to grow again. As of July 2010, the forum had been closed without notice, however, it has soon after being reopened.

== Closing ==
As of August 5, 2011, Sharereactor.com has fallen into silence once again, exactly ten years after its initial launch on August 5, 2001.

== See also ==
- File sharing
- eMule
- Ed2k URI scheme (used for eD2k links)
