= User revolt =

Type of website-based social conflict

A user revolt is a social conflict in which users of a website collectively and openly protest a website host's or administrator's instructions for using the website. Sometimes it happens that the website hosts can control a website's use in certain ways, but the hosts also depend on the users to comply with voluntary social rules in order for the website to operate as the hosts would like. A user revolt occurs when the website users protest against the voluntary social rules of a website, and use the website in a way that is in conflict with the wishes of the website host or administrators.

A user revolt is a process starting with a triggering event, then a rebellion, then a response to the rebellion.

== Distinction from Internet-based activism ==
Internet-based activism may sometimes take the form of user revolt in which website users protest the terms or policies of a website while continuing to use that website for other purposes. A distinction between a user revolt and Internet-based activism could be that in a user revolt, an objective of the protest is to revolt against the website itself. In Internet-based activism, the primary goal of the protest is something other than reforming a website, although websites which create barriers to the larger protest may incidentally experience a user revolt for participating in the larger conflict. An example of a situation in which Internet activism includes a user revolt might be when users wish to engage in prohibited political discussion, but a government compels the website host to censor those discussions. The core conflict in this case is between users and the government, and not that the website itself as a communication medium. However, when the website as a communication medium chooses to create barriers to communication for users, then users of the website organize a user revolt even when the primary objective is something other than a website protest.

Examples of Internet-based activism which led to user revolts include Social media and the Arab Spring and the Twitter Revolution.

== Examples ==
=== AOL ===
In 1997 AOL amended their Terms of service to permit them to sell users' telephone numbers to telemarketers. Users complained and in response AOL offered an opt-out system.

=== Digg ===
==== Publishing of DVD unlock code ====
In 2007 in the AACS encryption key controversy various Internet users began publishing the decryption code for the Advanced Access Content System on various websites. The impact was that the code enabled anyone to write simple software, for example DeCSS, which enabled anyone else to rip DVDs and copy the content as they liked. The release of the key and derivative ripping programs made the illicit distribution of copyrighted media much easier for anyone who wished to share content which was formerly locked by the AACS system.

The AACS codes were published in many places. One place in which they were published was the website Digg.

On May 1, 2007, an article appeared on Digg's homepage that contained the encryption key for the AACS digital rights management protection of HD DVD and Blu-ray Disc. Then Digg, "acting on the advice of its lawyers," removed posting submissions about the secret number from its database and banned several users for submitting it. The removals were seen by many Digg users as a capitulation to corporate interests and an assault on free speech. A statement by Jay Adelson attributed the article's take-down to an attempt to comply with cease and desist letters from the Advanced Access Content System consortium and cited Digg's Terms of Use as justification for taking down the article. Although some users defended Digg's actions, as a whole the community staged a widespread revolt with numerous articles and comments being made using the encryption key. The scope of the user response was so great that one of the Digg users referred to it as a "digital Boston Tea Party". The response was also directly responsible for Digg reversing the policy and stating: "But now, after seeing hundreds of stories and reading thousands of comments, you've made it clear. You'd rather see Digg go down fighting than bow down to a bigger company. We hear you, and effective immediately we won't delete stories or comments containing the code and will deal with whatever the consequences might be."

==== Digg v4 revolt and migration to Reddit ====
When Digg redesigned their website in 2010 the community revolted and used the platform to advertise a user migration to competitor Reddit.

Digg's version 4 release was initially unstable. The site was unreachable or unstable for weeks after its launch on August 25, 2010. Many users, upon finally reaching the site, complained about the new design and the removal of many features (such as bury, favorites, friends submissions, upcoming pages, subcategories, videos and history search). Kevin Rose replied to complaints on his blog, promising to fix the algorithm and restore some features.

Alexis Ohanian, founder of rival site Reddit, said in an open letter to Rose:

… this new version of digg reeks of VC meddling. It's cobbling together features from more popular sites and departing from the core of digg, which was to "give the power back to the people."

Disgruntled users declared a "quit Digg day" on August 30, 2010, and used Digg's own auto-submit feature to fill the front page with content from Reddit. Reddit also temporarily added the Digg shovel to their logo to welcome fleeing Digg users.

Digg's traffic dropped significantly after the launch of version 4, and publishers reported a drop in direct referrals from stories on Digg's front page. New CEO Matt Williams attempted to address some of the users' concerns in a blog post on October 12, 2010, promising to reinstate many of the features that had been removed.

=== Facebook ===
In 2006 there was a Facebook user revolt regarding privacy concerns with the creation of Facebook's news feed feature. Users worried that the news feed would show their posts to individuals outside their friend network. Facebook staff replied to users.

In 2007, there was a Facebook revolted over the automatic displaying of online purchase data and other online activity in news feeds. In response to the backlash, Facebook rolled back the changes.

In 2009, Facebook users revolted over changes to the terms of service. In response to the backlash, Facebook rolled back the changes.

In 2010 roughly 34,000 users left Facebook over loss of control over privacy settings (users could not opt out of sharing information publicly) as a part of the May 31 "Quit Facebook Day" campaign. Facebook rolled back some of the changes, allowing users to opt out.

In 2018, revelations about election subversion on Facebook in 2016 led to the popular hashtag #DeleteFacebook.

In June 2020, a social media campaign urged advertisers to stop or pause their Facebook advertising campaigns, in response to the company's hands-off approach to moderating content. Major brands including The North Face, REI, Patagonia, and Verizon took up the cause. The NAACP, Color of Change, and the Anti-Defamation League formed a coalition to drive the boycott, and Prince Harry and Meghan Markle worked behind the scenes to support the effort.

=== Instagram ===
In 2012 a change to Instagram's terms of service triggered a user revolt.

Even during the revolt Instagram continued to get many new users.

=== Livejournal ===
Livejournal users revolted in 2007 when Livejournal deleted some site content.

=== The Pirate Bay ===
In 2009 Global Gaming Factory X sought to purchase The Pirate Bay. This led to a user revolt when community participants protested that the sale was a betrayal of community values.

=== Reddit ===
On July 2, 2015, Reddit began experiencing a series of blackouts as moderators set popular subreddit communities to private, in an event dubbed "AMAgeddon" – a portmanteau of AMA ("ask me anything") and Armageddon. This was done in protest of the recent firing of Victoria Taylor, an administrator who helped organize citizen-led interviews with famous people on the popular "Ask me Anything" subreddit. Organizers of the blackout also expressed resentment about the recent severance of the communication between Reddit and the moderators of subreddits. The blackout intensified on July 3 when former community manager David Croach gave an AMA about being fired. Before deleting his posts, he stated that Ellen Pao dismissed him with one year of health coverage when he had cancer and did not recover quickly enough. Following this, a Change.org petition to remove Pao as CEO of Reddit Inc. reached over 200,000 signatures. Pao posted a response on July 3 as well as an extended version of it on July 6 in which she apologized for bad communication and not delivering on promises. She also apologized on behalf of the other administrators and noted that problems already existed over the past several years. On July 10, Pao resigned as CEO and was replaced by former CEO and co-founder Steve Huffman.

=== Twitter ===
In 2013 Twitter users organized a revolt when Twitter took away a defensive tool that allowed people to protect themselves from other users that they chose to block. In response to the revolt Twitter restored some rights to its users.

=== Wikipedia ===
==== Spanish fork ====
The Enciclopedia Libre was founded by contributors to the Spanish-language Wikipedia who decided to start an independent project. Led by Edgar Enyedy, they left Wikipedia on 26 February 2002, and created the new website, hosted free by the University of Seville, with the freely licensed articles of the Spanish-language Wikipedia. The split was provoked over concern that Wikipedia would accept advertising. After Wikipedia made a commitment to not use advertising, the Spanish fork attracted no more attention, and was mostly abandoned within a year of its founding.

==== VisualEditor ====
In 2012 The Daily Dot suggested that the Wikimedia Foundation's pursuit of more users may be at the risk of alienating the existing editors. Some experienced editors have expressed concerns about the rollout and bugs, with the German Wikipedia community voting overwhelmingly against making the VisualEditor the new default, and expressing a preference for making it an "opt-in" feature instead. Despite these complaints, the Wikimedia Foundation continued with the rollout to other languages. The Register said, "Our brief exploration suggests it certainly removes any need to so much as remember what kind of parenthesis belongs where." The Economist's L.M., said it is "the most significant change in Wikipedia's short history." Softpedia ran an article titled "Wikipedia's New VisualEditor Is the Best Update in Years and You Can Make It Better". Some opponents have said that users may feel belittled by the implication that "certain people" are confused by wiki markup and therefore need the VisualEditor.

The Daily Dot reported on 24 September 2013 that the Wikimedia Foundation had experienced a mounting backlash from the English Wikipedia community, which criticised the VisualEditor as slow, poorly implemented and prone to break articles' existing text formatting. In the resulting "test of wills" between the community and the Foundation, a single volunteer administrator overrode the Wikimedia Foundation's settings to change the availability of VisualEditor from opt-out to opt-in. The Foundation acquiesced, but vowed to continue developing and improving the VisualEditor.

==== Superprotect ====
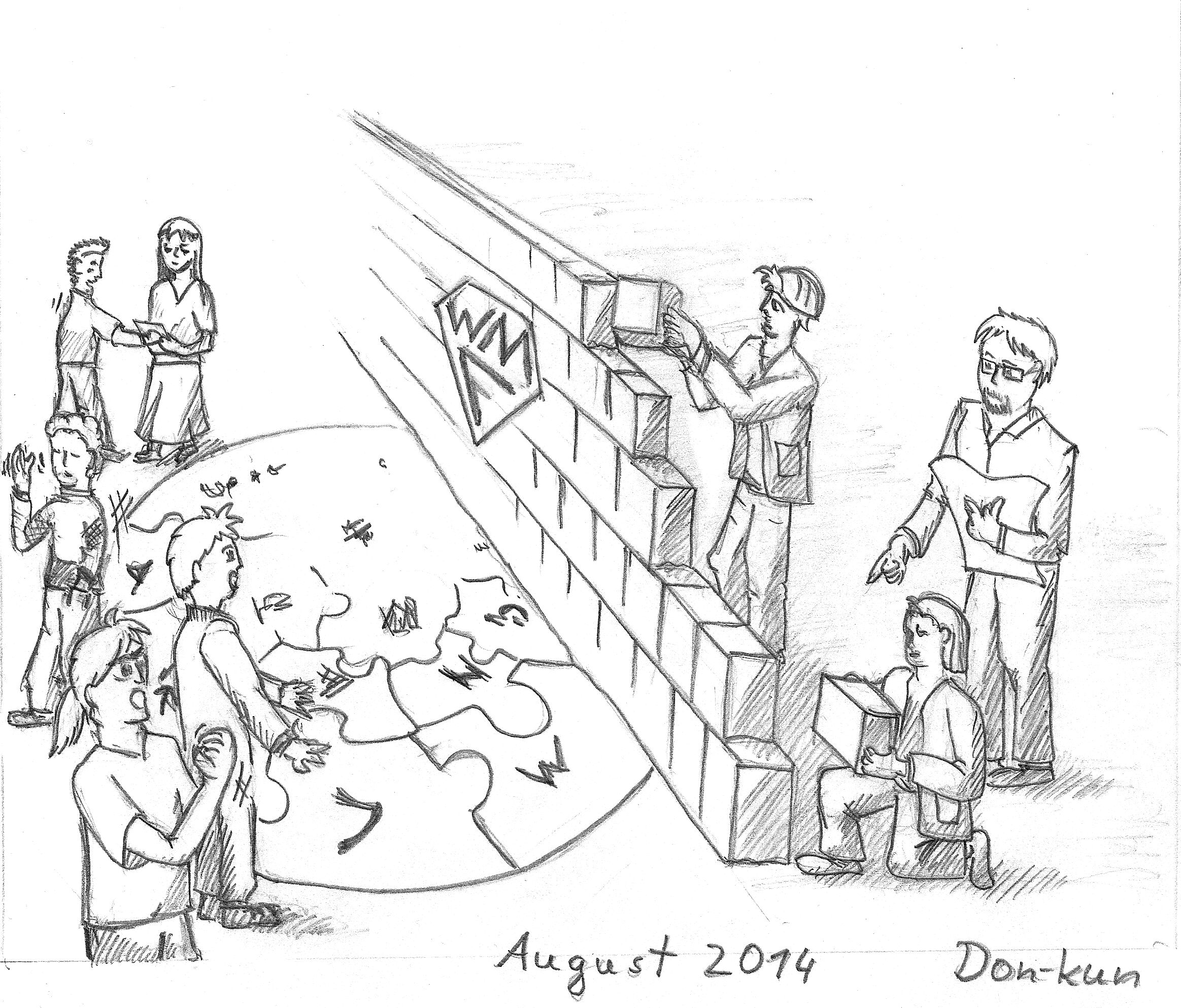
Satirical cartoon depicting the Wikimedia Foundation building a wall to prevent the volunteer Wikimedia community from participating in Wikipedia

"Superprotect" was the name for a superuser tool granted to Wikimedia Foundation staff but denied to all Wikimedia community members. In 2014 Wikimedia Foundation staff used the tool to force the installation of a new software feature on the German Wikipedia against the wishes of the Wikimedia community, who felt the feature was buggy and not ready for general use. This conflict was unprecedented. Erik Möller, then director of the Wikimedia Foundation, managed the Superprotect tool. Wikimedia commentator Andrew Lih described the superprotect feature as "Orwellian-sounding".

The MediaViewer and Superprotect conflict between the Wikimedia community and the Wikimedia Foundation was called a revolt. The controversy demonstrated that the Wikimedia Foundation was unable to control the Wikimedia community with technical features, but rather, that mutual understanding and discussion among stakeholders would be required to develop Wikipedia's software.

==== Representative dismissals ====
Wikimedia users organized a revolt to call for the removal of Arnnon Geshuri, a member of the board of the Wikimedia Foundation.

Wikimedia Foundation head Lila Tretikov resigned in February 2016 during a user revolt calling for institutional changes.

==== Wikimedia Foundation ban of Fram ====
On 10 June 2019, the English Wikipedia administrator Fram was banned by the Wikimedia Foundation (WMF) from editing the English Wikipedia for a period of 1 year. According to Joseph Bernstein of BuzzFeed News, this took place "without a trial", and WMF did not "disclose the complainer nor the complaint" to the community. Some in the editor community expressed anger at the WMF not providing specifics, as well as skepticism as to whether Fram deserved the ban. Another administrator unblocked Fram, later citing "overwhelming community support", but the WMF reblocked Fram. Two weeks after the ban of Fram, nine English Wikipedia administrators had resigned.

== See also ==
- Web hosting service
