= AXXo =

Alias of an unidentified internet pirate

aXXo
- Visual of aXXo ASCII art in .nfo file by kug.
- Years active: 2005–2009
- Known for: Content distribution

aXXo is the Internet alias of an individual who released and standardized commercial film DVDs as free downloads on the Internet between 2005 and 2009. The files, which were usually new films, were popular among the file sharing community using peer-to-peer file sharing protocols such as BitTorrent. A download-tracking firm BigChampagne found— in a sampling period in late 2008— that almost 33.5% of all movie downloads were aXXo torrents. aXXo encoded files to approximately 700 MB— the same capacity as a compact disc. Due to the re-encoded quality of an aXXo file, the suffix "aXXo" was often used by imitators.

== History ==
aXXo first appeared in November 2005 on the message board "Darkside_RG".

In November 2007, aXXo deleted all of their files released after September 7, 2006 from The Pirate Bay protesting that the site was allowing harassing comments to be added to their torrents by "possible members of MPAA". While past aXXo torrents remained available on other torrent sites, uploads of new aXXo files stopped on November 11, 2007. After an absence of four months aXXo returned to uploading, starting with the movie I Am Legend on March 9, 2008.

On December 15, 2008, aXXo's thousandth movie upload, a copy of the Kiefer Sutherland horror film Mirrors, appeared on an Internet forum for the Darkside Release Group.

On March 11, 2009, aXXo stopped uploading new files after releasing Punisher: War Zone. For a while, they logged into Mininova until the site switched to only hosting torrents that were Content Distribution free or torrents with no copyrights.

On April 19, 2009 aXXo made their last known comment on message board "Darkside_RG", in response to rumours that they had stopped posting on Darkside_RG. They stated:

I can only say a big thank you for your appreciation mates, I hope you all enjoy the darkside as much as you can My home is my beloved Darkside and as I've said so many times before on each of my torrents.... Be aware of bogus sites and lamers See ya.

== Format information ==
aXXo would convert a commercial DVD movie into an .avi file of approximately 700 MB size; this .avi was then used to create a .torrent file, which would then be uploaded to Bittorrent trackers, after which the movie in question would be available for download. On file sharing websites, aXXo files attracted large followings with more than a million users downloading aXXo files each month. Files released by aXXo followed the naming convention "Name.Of.Movie[year]DvDrip[Eng]-aXXo.avi", where "DvDrip[Eng]" implied it was ripped from an English-language disc and "avi" referred to the resulting file format. The video was encoded according to the MPEG-4 ASP standard, compatible with the Xvid codec. The aXXo postings also carried an .nfo file about the movie and an attached text file that stated, in part: "Be aware of bogus sites and lamers, download your aXXo files from aXXo accounts. Enjoy!"

== Identity ==
In a purported interview of a person claiming to be aXXo, they described themselves as a single individual who has been ripping DVDs since they were a teenager.

=== Imitators ===
Due to its popularity in the file sharing subculture, the pseudonym aXXo is falsely assumed by a variety of individuals and groups to mimic the source identity as a disguise for their own uploads on file sharing websites. A portion of such decoys is made available by a range of companies in the field of copyright enforcement, such as BayTSP, MediaDefender, or MediaSentry, with the aim of suing to make a profit. These faked files, or groups of files, would normally contain useless or potentially malicious data. The type of maliciously fake files include RAR format files that require the users to download a trojan disguised as a codec needed to view associated .avi format files. Other fake files encourage the users to register on dubious websites or require the users install the 3wPlayer (formerly "DomPlayer") software, which is malware that disguises itself as a media player. Fake files may also contain malware with the capability to send the IP address of the user's computer to a private server. For years, aXXo had been warning followers to “beware of bogus sites and lamers” in the .nfo files which accompany their torrents.

About a year after aXXo signed off in 2009, a group called YIFY began uploading similar torrents focusing on efficiency and small sizes.

== See also ==
- Warez
- YIFY
