= List of websites blocked in the Philippines =

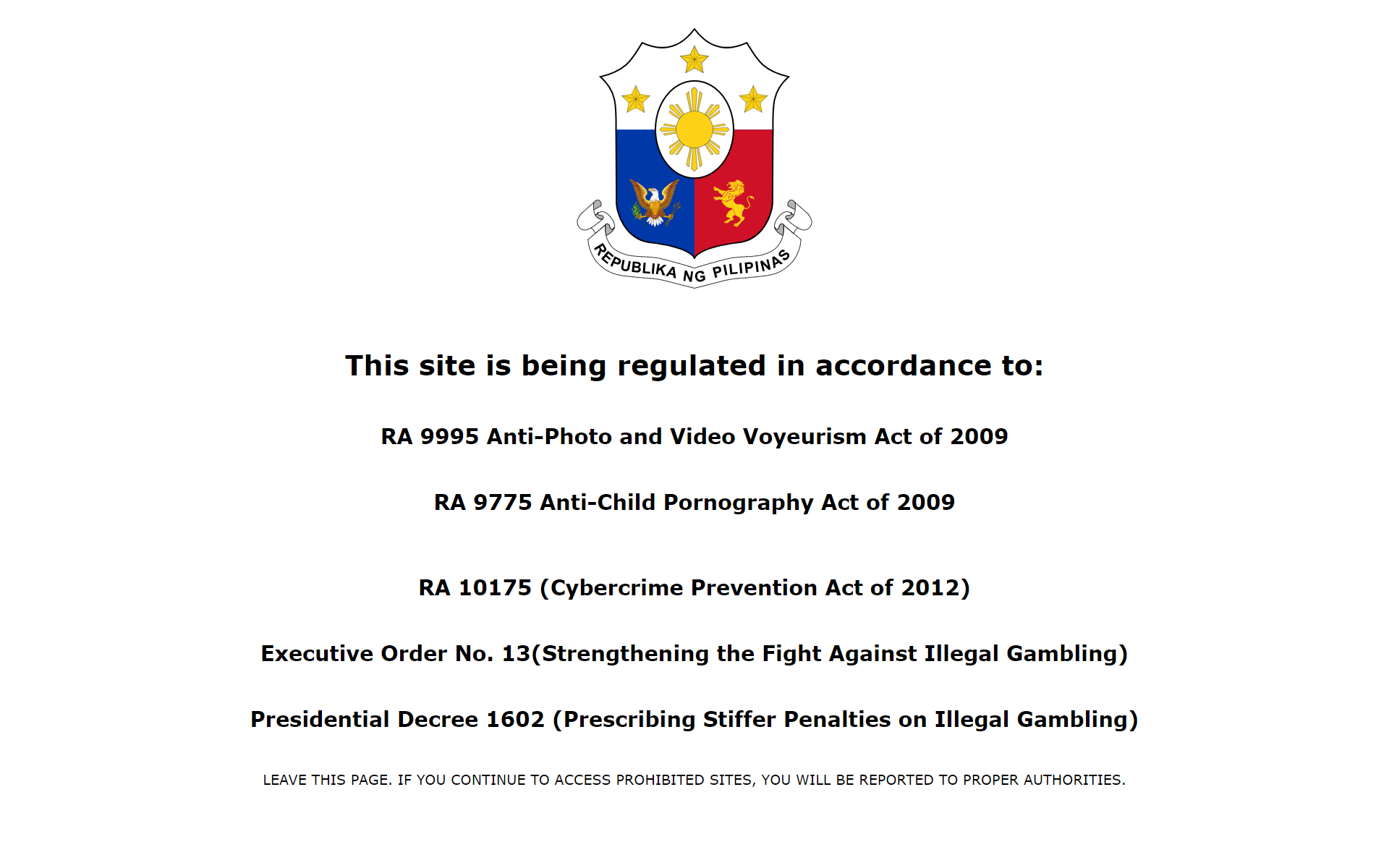
A 2024 notice that appears when attempting to access censored sites in the Philippines.

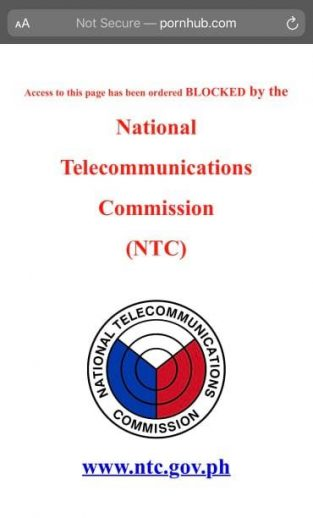
A 2020 notice by the National Telecommunications Commission informing the user that it has blocked access to Pornhub.

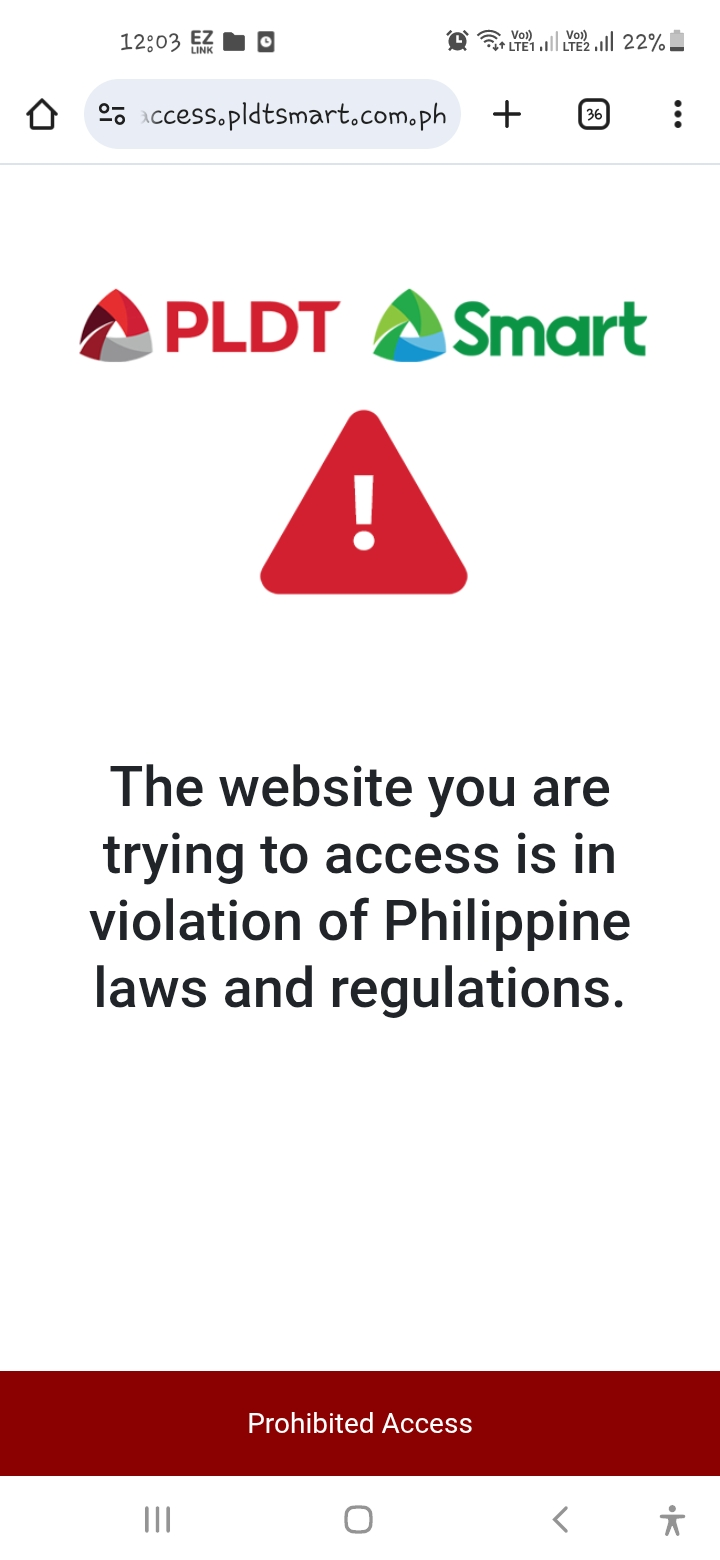
PLDT-Smart Prohibited Access Page

Certain websites in the Philippines may be blocked by internet service providers (ISPs) in compliance with government orders, particularly those issued by the National Telecommunications Commission (NTC) and other law enforcement agencies. The grounds for blocking include pornography, child exploitation, illegal gambling, and national security.

== Pornographic websites (since January 2017) ==
Based on the order of the National Telecommunications Commission in January 2017, pornographic websites were blocked in accordance with Philippine laws such as Republic Act No. 9775 (Anti-Child Pornography Act) and Republic Act No. 7610 (Special Protection of Children Against Abuse, Exploitation and Discrimination Act).

Website	URL	Category	Primary Language	Year of Blocking	Status in some ISPs	Reason
Pornhub	www.pornhub.com	Pornography	Multilingual	January 14–16, 2017–Present	Partially Blocked in some ISPs (NTC 2017)	Republic Act No. 9775 (Anti-Child Pornography Act) and Republic Act No. 7610 (Special Protection of Children Against Abuse, Exploitation and Discrimination Act).
XVideos	www.xvideos.com	Pornography	Multilingual	January 14–16, 2017–Present	Partially Blocked in some ISPs	Republic Act No. 9775 (Anti-Child Pornography Act) and Republic Act No. 7610 (Special Protection of Children Against Abuse, Exploitation and Discrimination Act).
XHamster	www.xhamster.com	Pornography	Multilingual	January 14–16, 2017–Present	Partially Blocked in some ISPs	Republic Act No. 9775 (Anti-Child Pornography Act) and Republic Act No. 7610 (Special Protection of Children Against Abuse, Exploitation and Discrimination Act).
RedTube	www.redtube.com	Pornography	Multilingual	January 14–16, 2017–Present	Partially Blocked in some ISPs	Republic Act No. 9775 (Anti-Child Pornography Act) and Republic Act No. 7610 (Special Protection of Children Against Abuse, Exploitation and Discrimination Act).
Motherless	motherless.com	Pornography	Multilingual	January 14–16, 2017–Present	Blocked	Republic Act No. 9775 (Anti-Child Pornography Act) and Republic Act No. 7610 (Special Protection of Children Against Abuse, Exploitation and Discrimination Act).
YouPorn	www.youporn.com	Pornography	Multilingual	January 14–16, 2017–Present	Partially Blocked in some ISPs	Republic Act No. 9775 (Anti-Child Pornography Act) and Republic Act No. 7610 (Special Protection of Children Against Abuse, Exploitation and Discrimination Act).
ThisVid	www.thisvid.com	Pornography	Multilingual	January 14–16, 2017–Present	Blocked	Republic Act No. 9775 (Anti-Child Pornography Act) and Republic Act No. 7610 (Special Protection of Children Against Abuse, Exploitation and Discrimination Act).: DNS filtering is used to block the website.

=== Other pornography websites ===
Website	URL	Category	Primary Language	Year of Blocking	Status in some ISPs	Reason
alt.sex.stories	asstr.org	Erotic literature	Multilingual	January 1, 2023–Present	Blocked	May contain erotic content that does not comply with the policies of the NTC and may include inappropriate or illegal material

== International cryptocurrency exchanges ==
The Philippine government, through the Securities and Exchange Commission (SEC) and the National Telecommunications Commission (NTC), began intensifying regulatory action against international cryptocurrency exchanges in 2024. On March 26, 2024, the SEC formally announced its decision to block Binance for operating without a license, citing violations of financial services regulations and the country’s Anti-Money Laundering Laws. The following day, on March 27, 2024, the NTC ordered major telecommunications companies and internet service providers to restrict access to Binance’s website, though its mobile and desktop applications remained accessible.

On April 19, 2024, the SEC sent letters to both Google and Apple requesting the removal of the Binance app from their respective app stores in the Philippines, expressing concerns that its continued availability posed a risk to the funds of Filipino investors. By July 30, 2024, the SEC reaffirmed its stance, stating it remained optimistic that both Google and Apple would comply with its request.

On August 1, 2025, the SEC escalated its crackdown by issuing directives to block ten additional international platforms, such as Bybit, Bitget, KuCoin, OKX, Kraken, and MEXC, after finding that they were conducting operations in the Philippines without the required registration as Virtual Asset Service Providers (VASPs). These enforcement actions were grounded in SEC Memorandum Circular Nos. 4 and 5 (2025), issued under the Virtual Asset Act, which mandated that VASPs must establish a physical office in the Philippines, meet minimum capitalization requirements, and comply with reporting obligations.

Although access to the websites of these exchanges was blocked by internet service providers starting in August 2025, most of their mobile and desktop applications continued to function, illustrating the difficulties regulators faced in fully implementing the restrictions. As of September 2025, the SEC has also formally requested that these cryptocurrency exchange applications, including Binance, be removed from the Google Play Store and Apple App Store in the Philippines; while the request is still under consideration by the platforms, the apps remain currently available for download.

Website	URL	Category	Primary Language	Year of Blocking	Status in Some ISPs	Reason
Binance	www.binance.com	Cryptocurrency	Multilingual	June 2024–Present (Binance mobile app and desktop app are still accessible)	Blocked	Does not provide license, taxes, or regulation to the Bangko Sentral ng Pilipinas (BSP) and Securities and Exchange Commission (SEC); violates Financial Services Regulations and Anti-Money Laundering Laws.
Binance (United States)	www.binance.us	Cryptocurrency	English (United States)	Not Blocked	Unblocked	Because it only exists in the United States and complies with U.S. laws and regulations.
Bitget	www.bitget.com	Cryptocurrency	Multilingual	August 1, 2025–Present (Mobile app and desktop app are still accessible)	Blocked	Operated in the Philippines without the required license or registration from the SEC as a Virtual Asset Service Provider (VASP), violating SEC Memorandum Circular Nos. 4 and 5 (2025) under the Virtual Asset Act, which requires local registration, physical office presence, minimum capital, and compliance reporting.
BitMart	www.bitmart.com	Cryptocurrency	Multilingual	August 1, 2025–Present (Mobile app and desktop app are still accessible)	Blocked	Operated in the Philippines without the required license or registration from the SEC as a Virtual Asset Service Provider (VASP), violating SEC Memorandum Circular Nos. 4 and 5 (2025) under the Virtual Asset Act, which requires local registration, physical office presence, minimum capital, and compliance reporting.
Bybit	www.bybit.com	Cryptocurrency	Multilingual	August 1, 2025–Present (Mobile app and desktop app are still accessible)	Blocked	Operated in the Philippines without the required license or registration from the SEC as a Virtual Asset Service Provider (VASP), violating SEC Memorandum Circular Nos. 4 and 5 (2025) under the Virtual Asset Act, which requires local registration, physical office presence, minimum capital, and compliance reporting.
CoinEx	www.coinex.com	Cryptocurrency	Multilingual	August 1, 2025–Present (Mobile app and desktop app are still accessible)	Blocked	Operated in the Philippines without the required license or registration from the SEC as a Virtual Asset Service Provider (VASP), violating SEC Memorandum Circular Nos. 4 and 5 (2025) under the Virtual Asset Act, which requires local registration, physical office presence, minimum capital, and compliance reporting.
Kraken	www.kraken.com	Cryptocurrency	Multilingual	August 1, 2025–Present (Mobile app and desktop app are still accessible)	Blocked	Operated in the Philippines without the required license or registration from the SEC as a Virtual Asset Service Provider (VASP), violating SEC Memorandum Circular Nos. 4 and 5 (2025) under the Virtual Asset Act, which requires local registration, physical office presence, minimum capital, and compliance reporting.
KuCoin	www.kucoin.com	Cryptocurrency	Multilingual	August 1, 2025–Present (Mobile app and desktop app are still accessible)	Blocked	Operated in the Philippines without the required license or registration from the SEC as a Virtual Asset Service Provider (VASP), violating SEC Memorandum Circular Nos. 4 and 5 (2025) under the Virtual Asset Act, which requires local registration, physical office presence, minimum capital, and compliance reporting.
MEXC	www.mexc.com	Cryptocurrency	Multilingual	August 1, 2025–Present (Mobile app and desktop app are still accessible)	Blocked	Operated in the Philippines without the required license or registration from the SEC as a Virtual Asset Service Provider (VASP), violating SEC Memorandum Circular Nos. 4 and 5 (2025) under the Virtual Asset Act, which requires local registration, physical office presence, minimum capital, and compliance reporting.
OKX	www.okx.com	Cryptocurrency	Multilingual	August 1, 2025–Present (Mobile app and desktop app are still accessible)	Blocked	Operated in the Philippines without the required license or registration from the SEC as a Virtual Asset Service Provider (VASP), violating SEC Memorandum Circular Nos. 4 and 5 (2025) under the Virtual Asset Act, which requires local registration, physical office presence, minimum capital, and compliance reporting.
Phemex	www.phemex.com	Cryptocurrency	Multilingual	August 1, 2025–Present (Mobile app and desktop app are still accessible)	Blocked	Operated in the Philippines without the required license or registration from the SEC as a Virtual Asset Service Provider (VASP), violating SEC Memorandum Circular Nos. 4 and 5 (2025) under the Virtual Asset Act, which requires local registration, physical office presence, minimum capital, and compliance reporting.

== Online gambling and e-Sabong ==
Websites related to online gambling were blocked in accordance with the directives of the Philippine Amusement and Gaming Corporation and Republic Act No. 9287 (An Act Increasing the Penalties for Illegal Numbers Games), as well as regulations against e-Sabong.

Website	URL	Category	Primary Language	Year of Blocking	Status in some ISPs	Reason
PokerStars	pokerstars.com	Online poker	English	May 3, 2022–Present	Blocked	Republic Act No. 9287 (An Act Increasing the Penalties for Illegal Numbers Games)
Betfair	betfair.com	Sports betting	English	May 3, 2022–Present	Blocked	Republic Act No. 9287 (An Act Increasing the Penalties for Illegal Numbers Games)
PartyPoker	partypoker.com	Online poker	English	May 3, 2022–Present	Blocked	Republic Act No. 9287 (An Act Increasing the Penalties for Illegal Numbers Games)
888 Casino	888casino.com	Casino games	English	May 3, 2022–Present	Blocked	Republic Act No. 9287 (An Act Increasing the Penalties for Illegal Numbers Games)
Golden Palace	goldenpalace.com	Casino games	English	May 3, 2022–Present	Blocked	Republic Act No. 9287 (An Act Increasing the Penalties for Illegal Numbers Games)

== Progressive media and organizations (June 2022) ==
Websites of alternative media outlets and progressive groups were blocked pursuant to the order of the National Security Council in 2022, based on allegations that these were linked to terrorism or communism. Most of these groups have requested due process.

Website	URL	Category	Primary Language	Year of Blocking	Status with Some ISPs	Reason
Bulatlat	www.bulatlat.com	Alternative media	English and Filipino	June 2022–August 2022	Unblocked	Red-tagging; alleged violation of the Anti-Terrorism Law.
Bagong Alyansang Makabayan	www.bayan.ph	Progressive group	Filipino	June 2022–Present	Partially blocked by some ISPs	Alleged links to the CPP–NPA; pursuant to the Anti-Terrorism Law.
CounterPunch	counterpunch.org	American alternative media	English	June 2022–Present	Blocked	Alleged communist propaganda
Communist Party of the Philippines	cpp.ph (redirects to philippinerevolution.nu)	CPP media arm	Filipino	June 6, 2022–Present	Blocked (cpp.ph) (Not blocked: philippinerevolution.nu)	Official website of the CPP
Pinoy Weekly	pinoyweekly.org	Alternative media	Filipino	June 2022–Present	Blocked	Red-tagging; alleged links to the CPP–NPA–NDF
Save Our Schools Network	saveourschools.net saveourschoolsnetwork.wordpress.com	Advocacy network	English	June 2022–Present	Blocked	Advocacy opposing state policies; subject to red-tagging.
Rural Missionaries of the Philippines	ruralmissionaries.ph rmp-national.weebly.com	Non-governmental organization	English	June 2022–Present	Blocked	Alleged links to rebel groups
Pamalakaya-Pilipinas	pamalakayapilipinas.ph pamalakayaweb.wordpress.com	Sectoral organization	Filipino	June 2022–Present	Blocked	Advocacy group subjected to red-tagging
Monthly Review	monthlyreview.org	American international socialist site	English	June 2022–Present	Blocked	Allegedly leftist content
Philippine Revolution Web Central	prwcnewsroom.org	CPP media arm	English and Filipino	June 2022–Present	Partially blocked by some ISPs	Official website of the CPP
Liberation News	liberationnews.org	Activist news outlet (United States)	English	June 2022–Present	Partially blocked by some ISPs	Anti-government /leftist views

== Other websites ==
Website	URL	Category	Primary Language	Year of Blocking	Status in some ISPs	Reason
anonym	anonym.to	Redirect tool used to conceal the source site.	Multilingual	January 1, 2023–Present	Blocked	May be used to hide the actual destination of links, hindering the tracking of illegal content and may contain malicious links.
Discord	discord.com	Messaging	Multilingual	September 23-24, 2026	Unblocked	Alleged failure to comply with a 24-hour ultimatum by the Cybercrime Investigation and Coordinating Center (CICC) to establish a local office.
ModWorkshop	modworkshop.net	Catalog of modifications for video games	Multilingual	Unknown	Blocked	Unknown, its "Access Restricted" window describes it as an "unlicensed gambling site"
Grok	grok.com	Artificial Intelligence	Multilingual	January 16, 2026–January 22, 2026	Unblocked	Republic Act No. 9775 (Anti-Child Pornography Act of 2009) and Republic Act No. 10175 (Cybercrime Prevention Act of 2012)
Trendsmap	trendsmap.com	Social media analytics	Supports only a few languages, but primarily focused on English.	January 1, 2022–Present	Blocked	May contain or display real-time data or location of social media activity (such as Twitter/X) that can be used for disinformation or harmful purposes.
YTS (also known as YIFY Torrents)	yts.mx	Torrent website that shares pirated or copyrighted films via torrent.	Multilingual	May 18, 2024–Present	Blocked	Republic Act No. 8293 (Intellectual Property Code of the Philippines)
Kick	kick.com	Video livestreaming service	English	November 2025–Present	Partially blocked by some ISPs	Not licensed by the Philippine Amusement and Gaming Corporation.
