= Digital media service =

A digital media service (DMS) is an online service provider that sells access to digital library of content such as films, software, games, images, literature, etc. While no transfer of property is made, a nearly perfect duplicate of the data (song movie, etc.) is made on a customer's computer. Content is either primarily hosted on a dedicated server, which is owned by the service provider, or it is hosted primarily on the hard drives of its customers using a P2P protocol with, perhaps, a dedicated server to supplement.

== History ==
One example of the older business model is the iTunes Store, which still markets and prices data as individual retail products. There are no examples of the latter business model in operation yet, but one is currently in development by Global Gaming Factory X and expected to begin operation some time after they acquire The Pirate Bay domain on August 27, 2009.

A key difference between the two models is that the model which relies on its customer base for offering their bandwidth for other customers to access customer hosted data can operate at significantly lower costs than a company that seeks to limit data access to a per-download fee in order to supplement the cost of using its own hosting and bandwidth. The P2P model holds the potential for companies to offer unlimited access to the largest data library in the history of the internet to its customers for a reasonably low membership rate that is relevant to the cost of operation.

While the market is virtually untouched, the P2P supplemented model will need entrepreneurs who are able to overcome a series of challenges in order to compete with the older business model as well as that which is offered for free (and often against the wishes of copyright holders) by hundreds of P2P communities on the internet. These challenges include, but are not limited to: Offering better data quality, speed, convenience and ease of use, protocol, sense of security, indexing and search organization, site up time, data library size, customer support, advertising, artist/copyright holder incentives and compensation, incentives and compensation for customers hosting data and providing bandwidth, guaranteed seeding (available access to indexed data at all times), than competitors.
