= YTS =

YTS may refer to:

- Yamagata Television System, a television station in Yamagata Prefecture, Japan
- Youth Training Scheme, a United Kingdom on-the-job training scheme
- Timmins/Victor M. Power Airport (IATA code YTS)
- YIFY Torrents, a peer-to-peer release group and website shutdown in 2015
- several models of Yamaha tenor saxophones
- several tugboats in the Royal Canadian Navy
