= YouTorrent =

- Website type: Torrent search engine
- Website: youtorrent.com
- Launched: December 2007
- Current status: Offline

YouTorrent was a BitTorrent search engine which allowed parallel searches on different torrent search engines.

As of April 14, 2008, YouTorrent changed from searching all torrent sites to only sites which provide licensed, certified content. This change angered many users and caused most of them to leave the site.

As of 4 April 2013, YouTorrent shut down its services stating "The stigmatisation of the word torrent proved a hurdle that was too hard to overcome when trying to build a legitimate and legal platform." and introduced a new platform called Clowdy. Clowdy is a platform with music, film and photography in the one place.

== History ==
The YouTorrent.com domain was bought for $20,000. It originally searched torrents on The Pirate Bay.
