= PirateBrowser =

Tor Browser-based circumvention tool prepared by The Pirate Bay

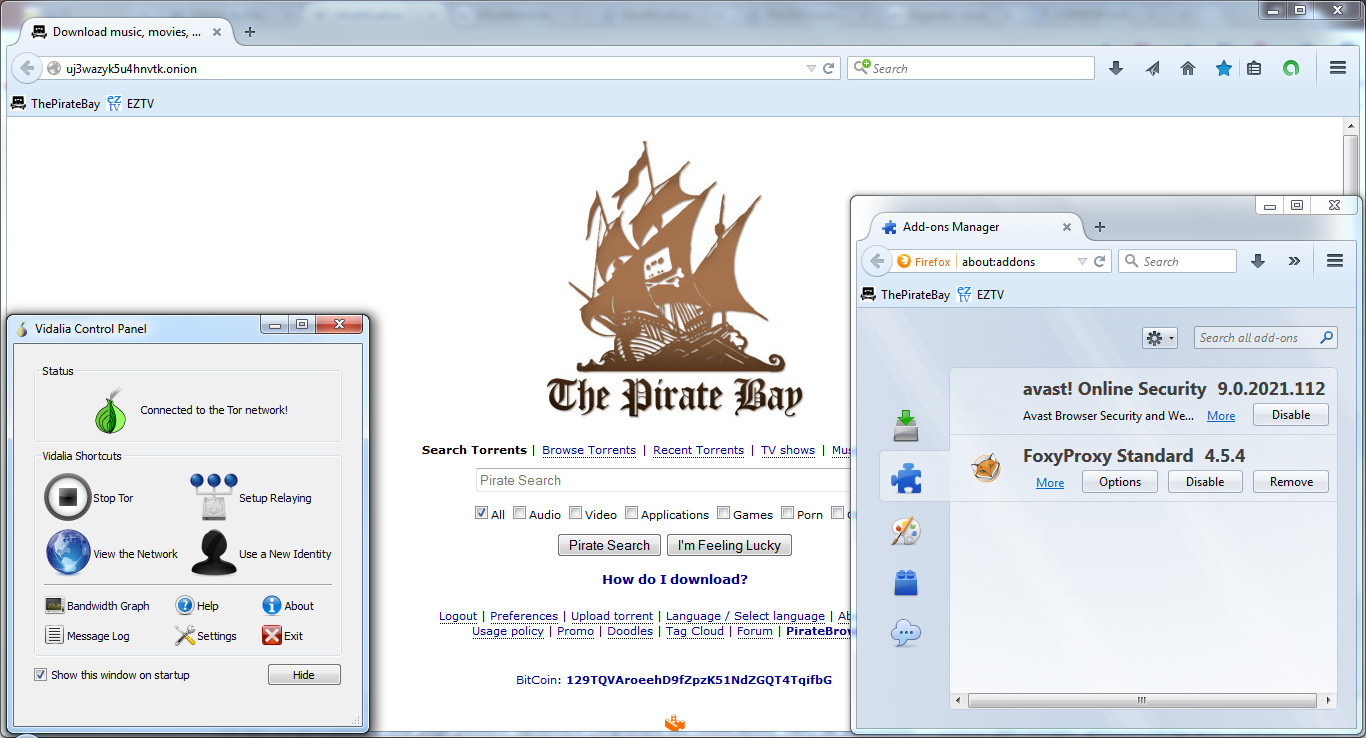
- Release: 10 August 2013; 12 years ago
- Stable release: 0.8 (9.0.9) / 13 April 2020; 6 years ago
- Operating system: Microsoft Windows
- License: Open source
- Website: The Pirate Bay: piratebrowser.com Team-LiL: Pirate Tor Browser

PirateBrowser is a web browser by The Pirate Bay used to circumvent Internet censorship.

== PirateBrowser ==
PirateBrowser was released on 10 August 2013 on the tenth anniversary of The Pirate Bay. It is a bundle of Firefox Portable 23, the FoxyProxy addon for Firefox, and the Vidalia Tor client with some proxy configurations to speed up page loading. According to TorrentFreak, it had been downloaded more than 100,000 times in its first three days, 1,000,000 times by October 2013, 2,500,000 times by 6 January 2014, and 5,000,000 times by 16 May 2014.

"It's not providing anonymity and it's not secure to hide your identity. PirateBrowser is only supposed to circumvent censoring and website blocking. If we made the browser fully anonymous it would only slow down browsing"

piratebrowser.com was suspended around December 2015.

The browser circumvents site-blocking in countries including, according to the Pirate Bay Web site, Belgium, Denmark, Finland, Iran, Ireland, Italy, The Netherlands, North Korea and the United Kingdom. This allows users to access some websites otherwise blocked, usually by government ban or threat of legal action by Internet service providers (ISPs) in these countries.

"The goal is to create a browser-like client to circumvent censorship, including domain blocking, domain confiscation, IP-blocking. This will be accomplished by sharing all of a site’s indexed data as P2P downloadable packages, that are then browsed/rendered locally"
