= Cybernorms group =

Cybernorms began officially on March 1, 2009 as a research project by Dr Måns Svensson, Stefan Larsson, and Professor Håkan Hydén of the Sociology of Law department at the University of Lund. The group researches how real-world norms interact with laws concerning file-sharing. The group is currently led by head researcher Måns Svensson. The group is exploring the rift between traditional society’s rules and the social norms that are generated from today's internet culture. The group also maintains the blog Cybernormer, launched in March 2009, to create a venue for knowledge and discussion on how the Internet creates new societal norms. Also discussed are norms in the shape of legislation aiming at regulation of and controlling activities on the internet. The blog covers the group's research within this field and occasional guests are brought in to write articles.

== Research ==
=== Social Norm Strength ===
In 2009, the group's first survey findings were published in a paper, Social Norms and Intellectual Property. The researchers came to the conclusion that there are "no social norms that hinder illegal file sharing. The surrounding imposes no moral or normative obstruction for the respondents file sharing of copyrighted content."

The group conducted a second survey, a comparison to the first survey, and an analysis of the effects of implementation of the IPR enforcement directive in Swedish law, generally called "the IPRED-law”, under preparation in an article on April 14, 2010. Preliminary results were released on the blog, and statements were made to national press when the IPRED law celebrated its first year in force. Later the results were also published in an article by Måns Svensson and Stefan Larsson in the journal New Media & Society.

In February 2012, the group conducted a third similar survey as a comparison to the two prior surveys. Partial preliminary results were released in Swedish media and on the project blog. The results mostly concerned the relation between copyright enforcement and online anonymity.

=== Collaboration with Pirate Bay ===
On April 18, 2011, the torrent site The Pirate Bay renamed itself to "Research Bay," a display of their collaboration with the Cybernorms group. The Pirate Bay encouraged its users to take a sociological survey about file-sharing related issues. Private information was promised not to be released. The survey, powered by Questback queried participants about what media they were most likely to share, and what sources they use to download besides The Pirate Bay. Questions included asking about uploading practices to P2P networks and how much they use free streaming media services to watch TV, films, and listen to music. The survey's stated purpose was to understand online norms and values, which the website goes on to say is essential to developing relevant and effective laws and policies. Another purpose of the survey was to help researchers to better understand habits and norms within the file-sharing community.

In early May 2012, the Cybernorms Research Group made a second major survey study, using the user base of The Pirate Bay to deepen their understanding of the file-sharing community.

== Publicity ==
The research group made the news in March 2009 when it found that millions of file-sharers hid their identities online. Its research showed that 10 percent of all Swedes between the ages of 15 and 25 were taking measures to protect themselves against increasing online surveillance. They also made news in their collaborative survey with Pirate Bay. Although The Pirate Bay had been a partner from the start, this was the first time the site’s users were being asked to participate.

== Funding ==
The project received funding from KK-stiftelsen from May 1, 2009, until April 2013. The four-year-project focused on an array of topics including illegal file sharing and its legal analog, online picture usage, and gaming for monetary reasons. This last topic focused on online poker and its normative structures and issues.

== See also ==
- Culture lag
