= YIFY =

Peer-to-peer movies release group

- YTS logo, adopted by YIFY in 2014
- Website type: Torrent index, magnet links provider, Peer-to-peer
- Available in: English
- Headquarters: Auckland, New Zealand
- Area served: Worldwide
- Creator: Yiftach Swery
- Registration: Optional, free
- Launched: 2010; 16 years ago
- Current status: Defunct as of October 30, 2015; 11 years ago
- Written in: HTML, JavaScript and PHP

YIFY Torrents or YTS (an acronym of Yiftach Swery) was a peer-to-peer release group known for distributing large numbers of movies as free downloads through BitTorrent. YIFY releases were characterized through their small file size, which attracted many downloaders.

The original YIFY/YTS website was shut down by the Motion Picture Association (MPA) in 2015; however, numerous websites imitating the YIFY/YTS brand still receive a significant amount of traffic. The name "YIFY" is derived from the name of the founder, Yiftach Swery, a college student (later an app developer, web developer and archery champion) from Auckland, New Zealand.

== History ==
YIFY Torrents was founded by Yiftach Swery in 2010 while he was studying computer science at University of Waikato. In August 2011, the YIFY brand was gaining enough traffic to warrant the launch of an official YIFY Torrents Website, although it was eventually blocked by United Kingdom authorities. A backup website yify-torrents.im was launched for users to bypass this ban.

The YIFY name continued to generate traction to the point where in 2013 'YIFY' was the most searched term on Kickass Torrents, along with other related search terms such as 'yify 720p', 'yify 2013' and 'yify 1080p'. This popularity was maintained through to 2015, where it was once again the most searched term on BitTorrent websites.

In January 2014, Yiftach announced that he was retiring from encoding and uploading, mentioning that it was 'time for a change' in his life. The website rebranded to YTS, and moved to a new domain name at yts.re. "YTS" is an abbreviation of "YIFY Torrent Solutions". Management was handed over to the existing team of staff members, and encoding was delegated to "OTTO" (an automated system) which would handle future encodes and uploads. Yts.re owned a company based in the UK, officially incorporated on 5 February 2015, with Yiftach taking the role as a company "programmer". The company was officially dissolved in February 2016. The website was reprogrammed at both the frontend and backend in February 2015, as part of a site overhaul to deal with increased traffic. The domain name was suspended by the FRNIC registry in March 2015 as a result of legal pressure, and as a result, the website moved to a new domain yts.to by 20 March 2015.

In October 2015, the YIFY website went down, with no word from any of the staff or those connected with the site, and no new YIFY releases. It was confirmed on October 30, 2015, that YIFY/YTS was shut down permanently. The site was shut down due to a lawsuit coming from the Motion Picture Association of America (MPAA). They filed a multi-million-dollar lawsuit against the website's operator, accusing him of "facilitating and encouraging massive copyright infringement". This news came as a surprise to some, such as a spokesman for the New Zealand Screen Association who would have expected the site to have been operating from Eastern Europe, the case with some other past websites. Swery was able to settle out of court a month later, signing a non-disclosure agreement. Yiftach did not resist legal action in any way, and co-operated with authorities as needed. In a 2016 Reddit AMA, Yiftach justified this saying that he never intended to "put up a fight", and had frequently told himself "When someone asks you to stop properly, you stop".

== Legacy ==
=== Unofficial clones ===
Since the shutdown of the official YIFY in 2015, many websites began to use the YIFY name unofficially. Some websites claimed to be the "new" YIFY, whilst others simply used the name for unrelated purposes such as streaming sites and subtitle download repositories, such as "YIFY Subtitles".

One particular imitator, YTS.AG, appeared very quickly after the shutdown of the real YIFY. The clone website was started by the same group who created a fake EZTV website. YTS.AG indexed all of the old YIFY uploads, whilst adding their own uploads under their own branding. There was immediate backlash to the imitator websites by multiple torrent index sites; RARBG and ExtraTorrent banned all YIFY/YTS imposters, while Kickass Torrents allowed them under the condition that they were uploaded under a different name. They have shifted domain names multiple times throughout their lifespan.

In May 2020, anti-piracy lawyer Kerry Culpepper sued multiple YIFY/YTS clones for trademark infringement. The Hawaii-based company "42 Ventures LLC" registered multiple trademarks related to movie piracy and torrenting (including YTS), and targeted the operators of yts.ws, yts.ms, yst.lt, yts.tl, ytsag.me, yts.ae, ytsmovies.cc and yts-ag.com for using the (newly registered) trademark without authorisation. Later, in June, the operator of YTS.WS (based in Russia) agreed to pay $200,000 in damages in relations to the trademark lawsuit.

=== In popular culture ===
In July 2016, the YIFY name made a cameo in an episode of the second season of the television series Mr. Robot, wherein the lead character Elliot is seen using the μTorrent client, and his Plex folder, filled with films from release groups such as RARBG and YIFY. When approached by TorrentFreak, Yiftach stated that he appreciated the "badass" mention.

== See also ==
- aXXo – similar BitTorrent distributor, active 2005–09
- Comparison of BitTorrent sites
- The Pirate Bay
- Copyright infringement
