= Serious Tubes Networks =

Swedish internet service provider

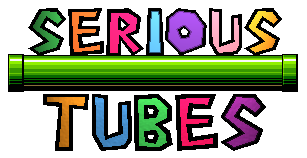
- Old logo of Serious Tubes Networks, featuring a tube from the Super Mario series.
- ASN: 50066
- Peering policy: Open

Serious Tubes Networks is an internet service provider based in Stockholm, Sweden. The company was best known for providing network connectivity for the Pirate Party of Sweden and for hosting The Pirate Bay, a major BitTorrent search engine.

In May 2011, the website of The Pirate Bay was unreachable to Comcast customers. Serious Tubes Networks later announced that it was due to a routing configuration error at Global Crossing, which was providing service for Comcast.

The company was founded in 2009. Their website was originally located at serioustubes.org, which later redirected to serioustubes.se. The site was offline from approximately August 2013 to September 2017, after which the company seems to have been relaunched.
