= Christine Schürrer =

German woman convicted of murder in Sweden

- Born: 30 June 1976 (age 50); Hanover, Lower Saxony, West Germany
- Status: Incarcerated
- Convictions: Double murder, attempted murder
- Penalty: Life imprisonment

Christine Schürrer (born 30 June 1976 in Hanover) is a German criminal, convicted of murdering two Swedish children, and seriously injuring their mother with 15 blows to the head with a hammer, after attacking them in their home in Arboga, Sweden, on 17 March 2008. The motive for the murders has been identified as jealousy, since Schürrer had dated the children's stepfather in 2006 while he was on holiday on the Greek island of Crete where she was working at a local hostel.

== Biography ==
=== Early life ===
Schürrer was born in Hanover, Germany. When she was 11 years old, her father left the family; Christine and her father had very little contact after that. She went to New York as an exchange student and lived with relatives in Manhattan. During her stay in the United States she also studied in Oklahoma. After she moved back to Germany, Schürrer settled in Göttingen where she studied history for the next six years before traveling to Athens, Greece. While in Athens Schürrer got a job at a hostel and also worked as a historian. After one year she moved back to her hometown in Germany to work but soon returned to Greece, this time to the island of Crete, where she met and had a romantic relationship with a Swedish man, the stepfather of her future victims.

=== Murders and arrest ===
Schürrer arrived in Sweden during the summer of 2007 and settled in Södermalm, in central Stockholm. She later found an apartment in Skarpnäck, a suburb of Stockholm. During this period Schürrer tried to commit suicide for a third time. She was admitted to Södersjukhuset hospital with cuts on her arms and was later released. She had previously tried to commit suicide because she felt betrayed by a Swedish man leaving her after a two-week romance in Greece. Police believe that Schürrer arrived in Arboga by train on the afternoon of 17 March 2008. She went to the victim's house and knocked on the door. When the mother, 23-year-old Emma Jangestig, answered the door, Schürrer entered the house and struck her over the head 15 times with a hammer. She then attacked the woman's two children, 3-year old Max and 1-year old Saga, causing fatal trauma to their heads. Schürrer had visited Arboga twice before on 12 March and 14 March, possibly to get more information as to the mother's location. The mother's ex-boyfriend, the father of the two children, was arrested, but he was released the next day after as it was established he was not the killer.

Schürrer was arrested in Germany on 22 March 2008, but was released the same day. On 24 March German police sent DNA samples from the suspect to Swedish police for testing. The mother had begun to wake up from her coma in a hospital at about the same time, and could identify Schürrer as her attacker. Swedish investigators also examined video from a surveillance camera in the Arboga railway station and a witness had identified Schürrer, proving that she had been in Arboga on the day and time of the murder. She had left Sweden and headed back to Germany on 18 March. She was arrested by German police on 30 March, the day after an arrest warrant had been signed. She was later transferred to Sweden for the trial.

=== Trial and sentence ===
On 26 August 2008 Schürrer was found guilty of the murders and the assault on the mother. She underwent a psychological evaluation to determine if she was fit to be sentenced to prison or should instead receive psychiatric treatment. She refused to cooperate with officials so it was impossible to make an accurate assessment of her psychological health. On 14 October 2008 she was sentenced to life in prison after an evaluation showed that she suffered from no mental illness as defined in Swedish law. If and when Schürrer is released from prison she will be deported from Sweden and barred from entering the country for life. Schürrer's defense attorney, Per-Ingvar Ekblad, said that he would take the case to the court of appeals. The case received extensive coverage from both Swedish and world media.

==== Autopsy photos ====
In September 2008, the Swedish media reported that the public preliminary investigation protocols concerning Schürrer's murder trial had been made available through a torrent on The Pirate Bay, a Swedish website providing magnet links. In Sweden, preliminary investigations become publicly available the moment a lawsuit is filed and can be ordered from the court by any individual. The documents included pictures from the autopsy of the two murdered children, leading their father Nicklas Jangestig to demand that the website remove the material; The Pirate Bay refused. The number of downloads increased to about 20,000 a few days later. On 11 September 2008, the website's press contact Peter Sunde participated in the debate program Debatt on the public broadcaster SVT. Sunde had agreed to participate on the condition that the father Nicklas Jangestig would not take part in the debate. Jangestig ultimately did participate in the program by telephone, which Sunde viewed as a betrayal by SVT. This resulted in The Pirate Bay suspending all of its press contacts the following day.

“I don’t think it’s our job to judge if something is ethical or unethical or what other people want to put out on the internet,” said The Pirate Bay’s spokesperson Peter Sunde to TV4.

=== Appeal ===
Schürrer appealed to the Svea Court of Appeal for a new trial. Her sentence was finalised on February 16 when her appeal was rejected. Schürrer was transferred to a women's prison in Vechta, Germany in March 2012 to serve out the remainder of her sentence. Schürrer is the seventh woman in Swedish history to be sentenced to life imprisonment.
