= ExtraTorrent =

Website providing torrent files and magnet links

- ExtraTorrent logo, as of November 2016
- Website type: p2p
- Available in: English
- Revenue: Advertisements, donations
- Website: extratorrent.cc
- Commercial: Yes
- Registration: Optional, free
- Launched: 2006
- Current status: Closed as of May 17, 2017; 9 years ago

ExtraTorrent (commonly abbreviated ET) was an online index of digital content of entertainment media and software. Until its shut down it was among the top 5 BitTorrent indexes in the world, where visitors could search, download and contribute magnet links and torrent files, which facilitate peer-to-peer file sharing among users of the BitTorrent protocol.

== History ==
ExtraTorrent was founded in 2006 by the administrator who acted under the alias "SaM".

In November 2016, the website celebrated its 10-year anniversary. The website briefly changed their logo with a celebratory theme and launched a contest for users to guess the most downloaded movies on the site in exchange for prizes.

=== Shutdown ===
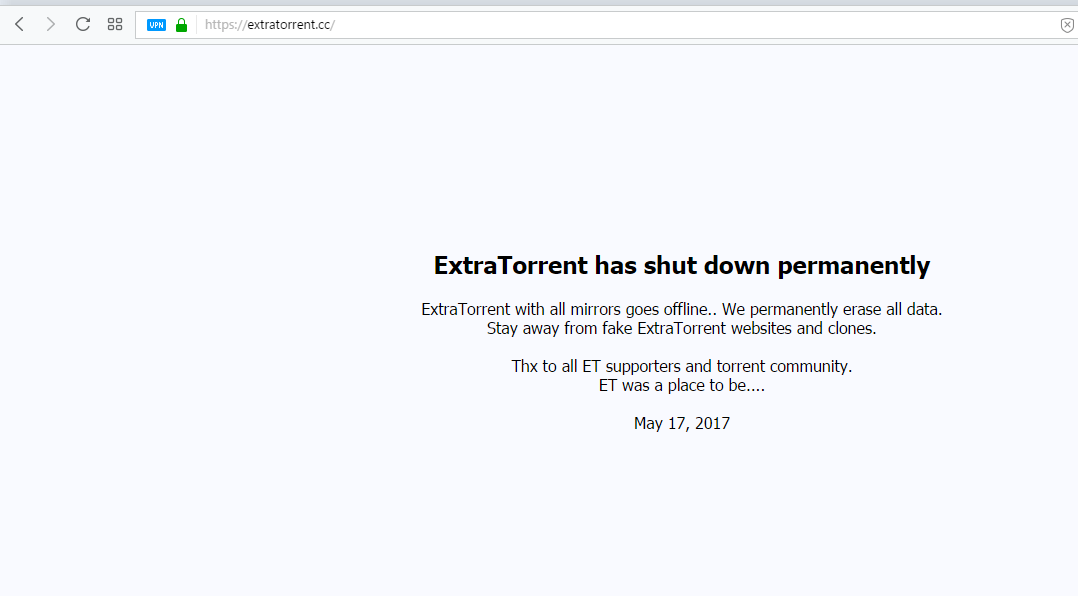
ExtraTorrent shutdown message on website

On 17 May 2017, ExtraTorrent voluntarily ceased operations out of the blue. The entire website was replaced with a message from the administrator, stating that the website was to shut down permanently (as well as all mirror domains), and wipe all data relating to the website and its content. The website was already down for days due to an emergency maintenance situation, just two days before the website shut down permanently.

At the time of its shutdown, ExtraTorrent's primary domain name was the 291st most viewed website globally, according to statistics from Alexa Internet.

== Clones ==
Shortly after the shutdown of the official ExtraTorrent website, multiple clones and imitations appeared online. Initially, the most popular one of these clones was located at extratorrent.cd. While this was at first speculated to be an official rehosting, it was later discovered to be a re-skin of The Pirate Bay, serving exact information from their database, under an ExtraTorrent interface. Despite this however, the website still quickly gained a large userbase, reaching two million unique visitors in May 2017. To date, there are no new "official" ExtraTorrent mirrors as the database for the original was wiped during its shutdown in 2017. The site was blocked in Spain in 2019, with the blocking of other similar websites such as Lime Torrents and 1337x.
