= KuCoin =

Seychelles-based cryptocurrency exchange

Kucoin
- Type: Private
- Founded: 2017; 9 years ago
- Founders: Chun Gan; Ke Tang; Johnny Lyu
- Headquarters: Seychelles
- Area served: Worldwide
- Key people: BC Wong (CEO)
- Services: Cryptocurrency exchange, margin trading, margin lending, OTC
- Website: kucoin.com

KuCoin is a Seychelles-based cryptocurrency exchange. It was founded in China in 2017, but was later moved to Singapore following the Chinese government's restrictions on cryptocurrency companies, and eventually to the Seychelles.

== History ==
=== 2017–2021: Early years and hack ===
KuCoin was founded in 2017 by Chun Gan, Ke Tang and Johnny Lyu in China. It raised initial funding through an initial coin offering, raising 5,500 Bitcoin, then valued at $27.5 million.

In 2018, KuCoin moved its headquarters from Hong Kong to Singapore. In November 2018, KuCoin raised $20 million in a Series A funding round led by IDG Capital, Matrix Partners and Neo Global Capital.

In September 2020, hackers gained access to KuCoin's hot wallets and stole $281 million of crypto assets. KuCoin offered rewards of up to $100,000 to anyone who could provide valid information regarding the hack. North Korean hacker crew Lazarus Group was accused of carrying out the hack, which was dubbed the biggest cryptocurrency hack of 2020. In February 2021, Lyu, then KuCoin's chief executive, said that 78 percent of the stolen funds had been recovered with the help of exchange and project partners and 6 percent with the help of law enforcement, and that the company and its insurance fund had covered the remaining 16 percent, so no user funds were lost.

=== 2022–present: Growth ===
In May 2022, KuCoin raised $150 million in a Series B funding round led by Jump Crypto, giving it a valuation of $10 billion. In July 2022, KuCoin received a $10 million investment from trading firm Susquehanna International Group. In Sep 2023, KuCoin Breaks 30 Million Users and celebrates its 6th Anniversary. By 2024, KuCoin had more than 30 million registered users in 207 countries and territories.

In January 2025, BC Wong, its former chief legal officer, was appointed CEO. In April 2025, KuCoin formed a joint venture with ERX Company and launched KuCoin Thailand. In the same year, KuCoin expanded its operations to Europe and Australia. As of 2025, KuCoin had 39 million active users.

In January 2026, KuCoin began its operations in Austria after receiving the MiCAR license. Later that month, Sabina Liu was appointed as managing director of KuCoin EU.

== Products ==
=== KuCoin Token ===
KuCoin Token (KCS), originally known as KuCoin Shares, is the native utility token of the KuCoin exchange. It was launched in 2017 and was initially issued as an ERC-20 token on the Ethereum blockchain. KCS as an exchange token used for trading-fee discounts and for distributing a portion of KuCoin's trading-fee revenue to token holders.

== Legal status ==
=== Australia ===
In November 2025, KuCoin registered with AUSTRAC as a digital currency exchange and began offering derivatives through an arrangement with AFSL holder Echuca Trading. KuCoin had previously operated in Australia through Bitcoin Australia, in which it invested $3 million in 2018.

=== Europe ===
In November 2025, KuCoin was authorised by Austria's Financial Market Authority (FMA) as a crypto asset service provider under the European Union's Markets in Crypto-Assets (MiCA) regulation. In December 2025, Frances Financial Markets Authority (AMF) listed KuCoin EU as authorised to provide crypto-asset services in France under the EU passporting regime.

As of 2026, KuCoin has suspended its trading operations in Austria.

=== Nigeria ===
In July 2026, KuCoin was admitted to the Accelerated Regulatory Incubation Programme (ARIP) of the Securities and Exchange Commission of Nigeria (SEC).

=== United States ===
As of 2026, KuCoin has no operations in the United States. After the collapse of FTX in November 2022, US senator Ron Wyden sent a letter to KuCoin and other major exchanges requesting information about balance sheets. In response, KuCoin published a Merkle tree-based proof of reserves and engaged the accounting firm Mazars to produce a third-party report.

In December 2023, KuCoin reached a settlement with the New York State Attorney General, agreed to pay $22 million in fines and refunds, and discontinued its trading operations in New York. In March 2024, co-founders, Chun Gan and Ke Tang were indicted on charges of operating an unlicensed money transmitting business and violating anti–money laundering protocols.

In January 2025, KuCoin admitted to charges of operating an unlicensed money transmitting business and agreed to pay nearly $300 million in fines and forfeitures.

In March 2026, KuCoin reached a settlement with the CFTC in a case initiated during the Biden administration. Before the settlement, KuCoin had partnered with World Liberty Financial. KuCoin said its listing of World Liberty-related tokens was part of its ordinary business operations, followed standard listing procedures, and was unrelated to its regulatory matters.
