= 3wPlayer =

Computer malware

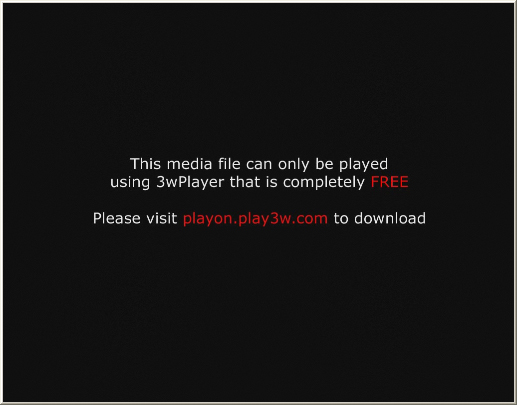
3wPlayer example

3wPlayer is malware that disguises itself as a Media player. It can infect computers running Microsoft Windows. It is designed to exploit users who download video files, instructing them to download and install the program in order to view the video. The 3wPlayer employs a form of social engineering to infect computers. Seemingly desirable video files, such as recent movies, are released via BitTorrent or other distribution channels. These files resemble conventional AVI files, but are engineered to display a message when played on most media player programs, instructing the user to visit the 3wPlayer website and download the software to view the video.

The 3wPlayer is infected with Trojan.Win32.Obfuscated.en According to Symantec, 3wPlayer "may download" a piece of adware they refer to as Adware.Lop, which "adds its own toolbar and search button to Internet Explorer".

A Perl script posted online can reportedly decrypt 3wplayer files back into AVI. This claim has been tested with mixed results, as the intended AVI file is rarely the desired video file. Some developers have made an application to automatically identify 3wPlayer encrypted files.

== Clones ==
There are multiple 3wPlayer clones:

=== DivoCodec and X3Codec ===
The DivoCodec or Divo Codec or X3Codec has also been identified as a trojan similar to 3wPlayer. Users are instructed to download the codec in order to view or play an AVI/MP4/MP3/WMA file, often downloaded via P2P programs.

Instead of actual codecs, DivoCodec installs malware on the users computer. The DivoCodec is polymorphic and can change its structure. It has also been known to write to another process' virtual memory (process hijacking).

=== DomPlayer ===
The DomPlayer is similar to the DivoCodec and 3wPlayer. Users are also instructed to download the player in order to view an AVI file.

As with DivoCodec, false .avi are easily spotted because of the duration of the file, usually lying at 10–12 seconds, of which one can conclude that there is no chance that that file may be a film/TV series, despite the size of the file. This is not always the case however, as many distributors have recently begun falsifying the file meta data to display normal durations and file sizes.

=== x3 player ===
x3 player is similar to DomPlayer, and instructs users to download this player to view the avi file. Also circulated is a 5-second ASF video which is disguised as an MP3 file instructing users to install this player.
