= Global Gaming Factory X =

Swedish advertising and software company

- Type: Corporation
- Industry: Software, Advertising, P2P
- Headquarters: Stockholm, Sweden

Global Gaming Factory X AB was an advertising and software company based in Sweden that relied on Internet cafes and gaming venues as its medium. Global Gaming Factory X used Smartlaunch and CyberCafePro's installed base of cafe management software at thousands of internet cafes and gaming centers around the world for digital distribution of advertising, software and services to the large groups of tourists at Internet cafes and the gamer community at gaming venues.

On 30 June 2009, Global Gaming Factory X announced its intention to buy the popular BitTorrent site The Pirate Bay. It also announced its intention to buy shares of Swedish P2P company Peerialism AB. Peerialism develops solutions for data distribution and distributed storage based on new P2P technology. The transaction was planned to take place in August 2009. Due to the buyers' financial troubles, the site was not sold.

Prior to the announcement, trading in GGF's stock was suspended due to abnormal trading volumes, leading to suspicions of insider trading. Global Gaming Factory X AB has been under receivership since the turn of the year 2011/2012. The bankruptcy was closed on 21 August 2013.
