= The Pirate Bay =

Website providing torrent files and magnet links

- Official logo as it appears on the website
- Website type: Torrent index, magnet links provider
- Available in: 35 languages available, primarily English and Swedish
- Creators: Fredrik Neij; Peter Sunde; Gottfrid Svartholm
- Revenue: Advertisements, donations
- Website: thepiratebay.org
- Registration: Optional, open, free
- Launched: 15 September 2003; 23 years ago
- Current status: Online
- Written in: HTML, JavaScript, and PHP

The Pirate Bay, commonly abbreviated as TPB, is a free searchable online index of movies, music, video games, pornography, audiobooks, e-books, and software. Founded in 2003 by Swedish think tank Piratbyrån, The Pirate Bay facilitates the connection among users of the peer-to-peer torrent protocol, which are able to contribute to the site through the addition of magnet links. The Pirate Bay has consistently ranked as one of the most visited torrent websites in the world.

Over the years the website has faced several server raids, shutdowns and domain seizures, switching to a series of new web addresses to continue operating. In multiple countries, Internet service providers (ISPs) have been ordered to block access to it. Subsequently, proxy websites have emerged to circumvent the blocks.

In April 2009, the website's founders Fredrik Neij, Peter Sunde and Gottfrid Svartholm were found guilty in the Pirate Bay trial in Sweden for assisting in copyright infringement and were sentenced to serve one year in prison and pay a fine. They were all released by 2015 after serving shortened sentences.

The Pirate Bay has sparked controversies and discussion about legal aspects of file sharing, copyright, and civil liberties and has become a platform for political initiatives against established intellectual property laws as well as a central figure in an anti-copyright movement.

== History ==
The Pirate Bay was established on 15 September 2003 by the Swedish anti-copyright organisation Piratbyrån (lit. 'The Piracy Bureau'); it has been run as a separate organisation since October 2004. The Pirate Bay was first run by Fredrik Neij and Gottfrid Svartholm with Peter Sunde as the spokesperson; the founders are known by their nicknames "TiAMO", "anakata" and "brokep", respectively. They have been accused of "assisting in making copyrighted content available" by the Motion Picture Association of America. On 31 May 2006, the website's servers in Stockholm were raided and seized by Swedish police, leading to three days of downtime. The Pirate Bay claims to be a non-profit entity based in Seychelles; however, this is disputed.

The Pirate Bay has been involved in a number of lawsuits, both as plaintiff and as defendant. On 17 April 2009 the founders and Carl Lundström were found guilty of assistance to copyright infringement and sentenced to one year in prison and payment of a fine of 30 million Swedish kronor (approximately US$4.2 million, £2.8 million sterling, or €3.1 million), after a trial of nine days. The defendants appealed the verdict and accused the judge of giving in to political pressure. On 26 November 2010, a Swedish appeals court upheld the verdict, decreasing the original prison terms but increasing the fine to 46 million kronor. On 17 May 2010, because of an injunction against their bandwidth provider, the site was taken offline. Access to the website was later restored with a message making fun of the injunction on their front page. On 23 June 2010, the group Piratbyrån disbanded due to the death of Ibi Kopimi Botani, a prominent member and co-founder of the group.

The Pirate Bay was hosted for several years by PRQ, a Sweden-based company, owned by Neij and Svartholm. PRQ is said to provide "highly secure, no-questions-asked hosting services to its customers". From May 2011, Serious Tubes Networks started providing network connectivity to The Pirate Bay. In May 2012, as part of Google's newly inaugurated "Transparency Report", the company reported over 6,000 formal requests to remove Pirate Bay links from the Google Search index; those requests covered over 80,500 URLs, with the five copyright holders having the most requests consisting of: Froytal Services LLC, Bang Bros, Takedown Piracy LLC, Amateur Teen Kingdom, and International Federation of the Phonographic Industry (IFPI). On 10 August 2013, The Pirate Bay announced the release of PirateBrowser, a free web browser used to circumvent internet censorship. The site was the most visited torrent directory on the World Wide Web from 2003 until November 2014, when KickassTorrents had more visitors according to Alexa. On 8 December 2014, Google removed most of the Google Play apps from its app store that have "The Pirate Bay" in the title.

On 9 December 2014, The Pirate Bay was raided by the Swedish police, who seized servers, computers, and other equipment. Several other torrent related sites including EZTV, Zoink, Torrage and the Istole tracker were also shut down in addition to The Pirate Bay's forum Suprbay.org. On the second day after the raid EZTV was reported to be showing "signs of life" with uploads to ExtraTorrent and KickassTorrents and supporting proxy sites like eztv-proxy.net via the main website's backend IP addresses. Several copies of The Pirate Bay went online during the next several days, most notably oldpiratebay.org, created by isoHunt.

On 19 May 2015, the .se domain of The Pirate Bay was ordered to be seized following a ruling by a Swedish court. The site reacted by adding six new domains in its place. The judgment was appealed on 26 May 2015. On 12 May 2016, the appeal was dismissed and the Court ruled the domains be turned over to the Swedish state. The site returned to using its original .org domain in May 2016. In August 2016, the US government shut down Kickass Torrents, which resulted in The Pirate Bay becoming once again the most visited BitTorrent website. As of 2025, The Pirate Bay is still on the top 10 of the most visited torrent sites of the year.

== Website ==
=== Content ===
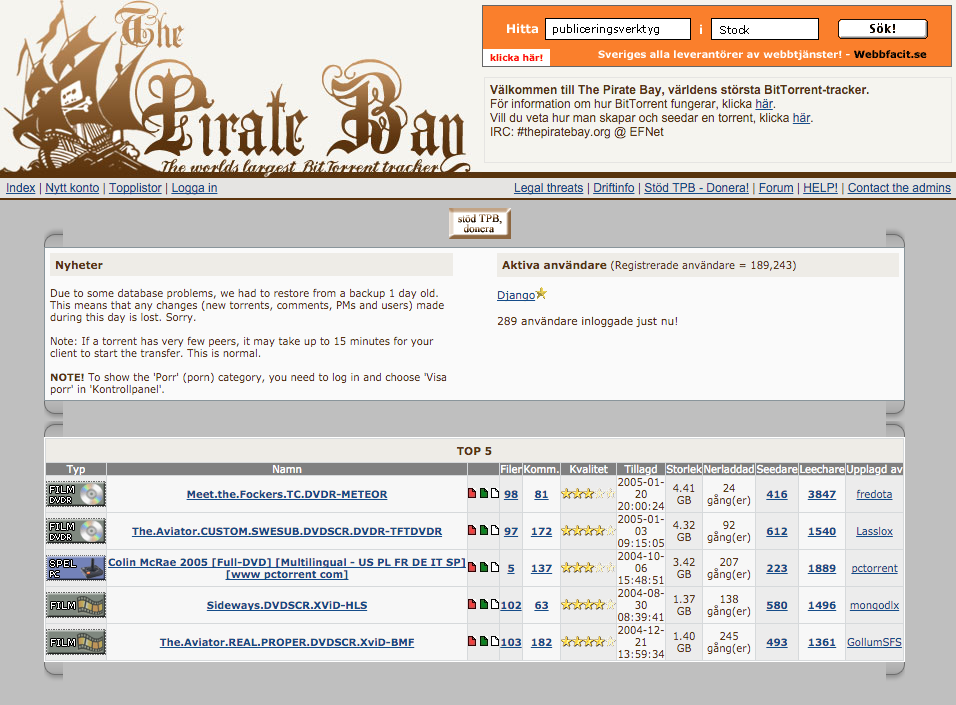
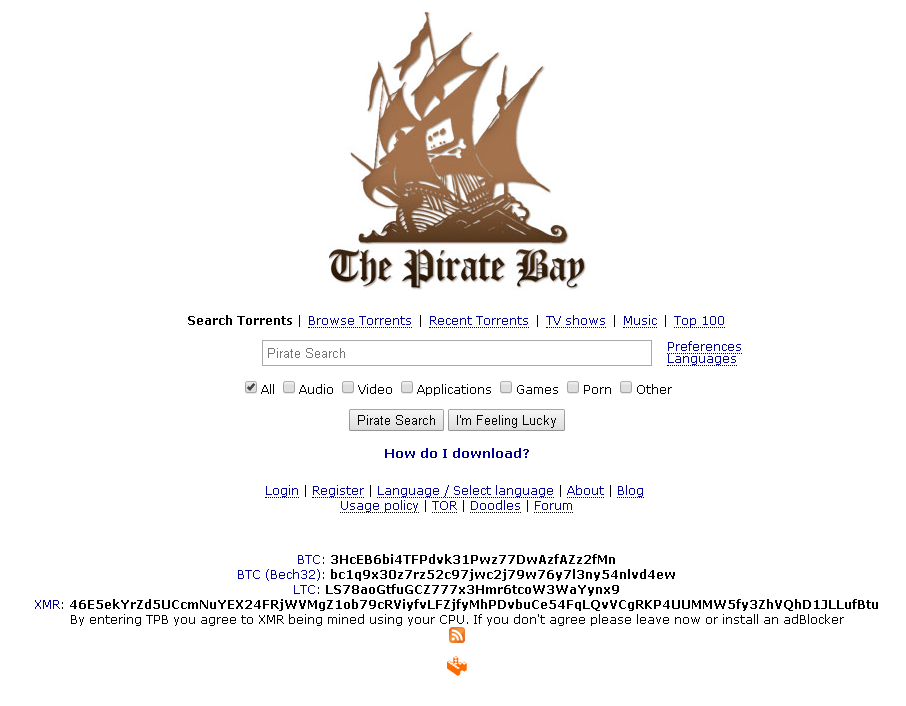
The Pirate Bay homepage in 2004 (top) and 2018

The Pirate Bay allows users to search for Magnet links. These are used to reference resources available for download via peer-to-peer networks which, when opened in a BitTorrent client, begin downloading the desired content. Originally, The Pirate Bay allowed users to download BitTorrent files (torrents), small files that contain metadata necessary to download the data files from other users. The torrents are organised into categories: "Audio", "Video", "Applications", "Games", "Porn", and "Other". Registration requires an email address and is free; registered users may upload their own torrents and comment on torrents. According to a study of newly uploaded files during 2013 by TorrentFreak, 44% of uploads were television shows and movies, porn was in second place with 35% of uploads, and audio made up 9% of uploads. Registration for new users was closed in May 2019 following problems with the uploading of malware torrents. Registrations were reopened in June 2023, following the closure of RARBG, which further restricted the online possibilities of new potential uploaders and pushed TPB team to act.

The website features a browse function that enables users to see what is available in broad categories like Audio, Video, and Games, as well as sub-categories like Audio books, High-res Movies, and Comics. Since January 2012, it also features a "Physibles" category for 3D-printable objects. The contents of these categories can be sorted by file name, the number of seeders or leechers, the date posted, etc.

Piratbyrån described The Pirate Bay as a long-running project of performance art. Normally, the front page of The Pirate Bay featured a drawing of a pirate ship with the logo of the 1980s anti-copyright infringement campaign, "Home Taping Is Killing Music", on its sails instead of the Jolly Roger symbol usually associated with pirate ships.

=== Technical details ===
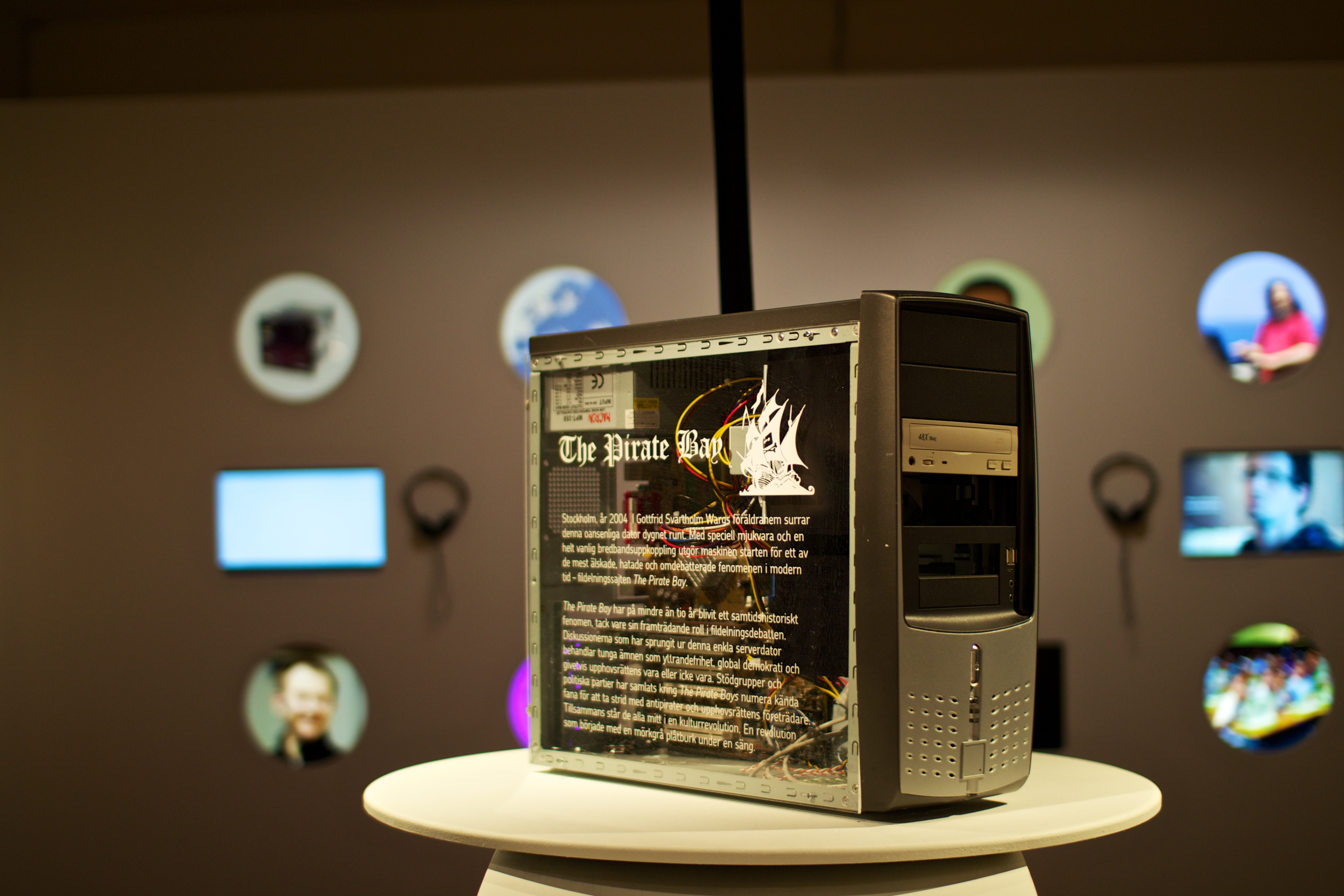
The first server for The Pirate Bay

Initially, The Pirate Bay's four Linux-based servers ran a custom web server called Hypercube. An old version is open-source. On 1 June 2005, The Pirate Bay updated its website in an effort to reduce bandwidth usage, which was reported to be at 2 HTTP requests per millisecond on each of the four web servers, as well as to create a more user friendly interface for the front-end of the website. The website now runs lighttpd and PHP on its dynamic front ends, MySQL at the database back end, Sphinx on the two search systems, memcached for caching SQL queries and PHP-sessions and Varnish in front of lighttpd for caching static content. As of September 2008, The Pirate Bay consisted of 31 dedicated servers including nine dynamic web fronts, a database, two search engines, and eight BitTorrent trackers.

On 7 December 2007, The Pirate Bay finished the move from Hypercube to Opentracker as its BitTorrent tracking software, also enabling the use of the UDP tracker protocol for which Hypercube lacked support. This allowed UDP multicast to be used to synchronise the multiple servers with each other much faster than before. Opentracker is free software.

In June 2008, The Pirate Bay announced that their servers would support SSL encryption in response to Sweden's new wiretapping law. On 19 January 2009, The Pirate Bay launched IPv6 support for their tracker system, using an IPv6-only version of Opentracker. On 17 November 2009, The Pirate Bay shut off its tracker service permanently, stating that centralised trackers are no longer needed since distributed hash tables (DHT), peer exchange (PEX), and magnet links allow peers to find each other and content in a decentralised way.

On 20 February 2012, The Pirate Bay announced in a Facebook post that after 29 February the site would no longer offer torrent files, and would instead offer only magnet links. The site commented: "Not having torrents will be a bit cheaper for us but it will also make it harder for our common enemies to stop us." The site added that torrents being shared by fewer than ten people will retain their torrent files, to ensure compatibility with older software that may not support magnet links.

== Funding ==
=== Early financing ===
In April 2007, a rumour was confirmed on the Swedish talk show Bert that The Pirate Bay had received financial support from right-wing entrepreneur Carl Lundström. This caused some consternation since Lundström, an heir to the Wasabröd fortune, is known for financing several far-right political parties and movements like Sverigedemokraterna and Bevara Sverige Svenskt (Keep Sweden Swedish). During the talk show, Piratbyrån spokesman Tobias Andersson acknowledged that "without Lundström's support, Pirate Bay would not have been able to start" and stated that most of the money went towards acquiring servers and bandwidth.

=== Donations ===
From 2004 until 2006, The Pirate Bay had a "Donate" link to a donations page which listed several payment methods, stated that funds supported only the tracker, and offered time-limited benefits to donors such as no advertisements and "VIP" status. After that, the link was removed from the home page, and the donations page only recommended donating "to your local pro-piracy group" for a time, after which it redirected to the site's main page. Billboard claimed that the site in 2009 "appeals for donations to keep its service running". In 2006, Petter Nilsson, a candidate on the Swedish political reality show Toppkandidaterna (The Top Candidates), donated 35,000 Swedish kronor (US$4,925.83) to The Pirate Bay, which they used to buy new servers.

In 2007, the site ran a fund intended to buy Sealand, a platform with debated micronation status. In 2009, the convicted principals of TPB requested that users stop trying to donate money for their fines, because they refused to pay them. In 2013, The Pirate Bay published its Bitcoin address on the site front page for donations, as well as Litecoin.

=== Merchandising ===
The site linked to an online store selling site-related merchandise, first noted in 2006 in Svenska Dagbladet.

=== Advertising ===
Since 2006, the website has received financing through advertisements on result pages. According to speculations by Svenska Dagbladet, the advertisements generate about 600,000 kronor ($84,000) per month. In an investigation in 2006, the police concluded that The Pirate Bay brings in 1.2 million kronor ($169,000) per year from advertisements. The prosecution estimated in the 2009 trial from emails and screenshots that the advertisements pay over 10 million kronor ($1.4 million) a year, but the indictment used the estimate from the police investigation. The lawyers of the site's administrators counted the 2006 revenue closer to 725,000 kronor ($102,000). The verdict of the first trial, however, quoted the estimate from the preliminary investigation.

As of 2008, IFPI claims that the website is extremely profitable, and that The Pirate Bay is more engaged in making profit than supporting people's rights. The website has insisted that these allegations are not true, stating, "It's not free to operate a Web Site on this scale", and, "If we were making lots of money I, Svartholm, wouldn't be working late at the office tonight, I'd be sitting on a beach somewhere, working on my tan." In response to claims of annual revenue exceeding $3 million made by the IFPI, Sunde argues that the website's high bandwidth, power, and hardware costs eliminate the potential for profit. The Pirate Bay, he says, may ultimately be operating at a loss. In the 2009 trial, the defence estimated the site's yearly expenses to be 800,000 kronor ($110,000).

There have been unintentional advertisers. In 2007, an online ad agency placed Wal-Mart The Simpsons DVD ads "along with search results that included downloads of the series". In 2012, banner ads for Canada's Department of Finance Economic Action Plan were placed atop search results, as part of a larger "media buy", but were pulled "quickly".

=== Cryptocurrency mining and tokens ===
In 2017, The Pirate Bay embedded scripts on its website that would consume resources on visitors' computers to mine the Monero cryptocurrency. Visitors were initially not informed that these scripts had been added. After negative feedback, the operators published an announcement stating that it was a test to see if it could replace advertisements. The mining script appeared and disappeared from the website repeatedly over the following months through 2018. In 2021, The Pirate Bay embarked in a short lived creation of their own crypto tokens, which were rapidly abandoned.

=== Fee ===
According to the site's usage policy, it reserves the right to charge commercial policy violators "a basic fee of €5,000 plus bandwidth and other costs that may arise due to the violation". Sunde accused Swedish book publishers, who scraped the site for information about copyrighted books, of violating the usage policy, and asserted TPB's copyright on its database.

== Projects ==
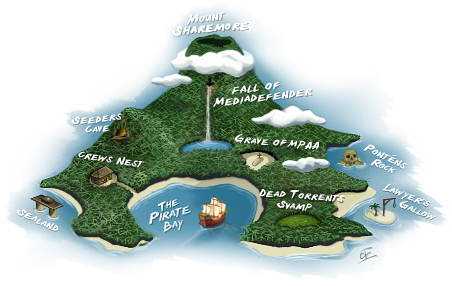
"Jubilee!" – on the homepage 31 January 2008

The team behind The Pirate Bay has worked on several websites and software projects of varying degrees of permanence. In 2007, BayImg, an image hosting website similar to TinyPic went online in June. Pre-publication images posted to BayImg became part of a legal battle when Conde Nast's network was later allegedly hacked. In July, "within hours after Ingmar Bergman's death", BergmanBits.com was launched, listing torrents for the director's films, online until mid-2008. In August, The Pirate Bay relaunched the BitTorrent website Suprnova.org to perform the same functions as The Pirate Bay, with different torrent trackers, but the site languished; the domain was returned to its original owner in August 2010, and it now redirects to TorrentFreak.tv. Suprbay.org was introduced in August as the official forum for ThePirateBay.org and the various sites connected to it. Users can request reseeding of torrents, or report malware within torrent files or illegal material on ThePirateBay.org.

BOiNK was announced in October 2007 in response to the raid on Oink's Pink Palace, a music-oriented BitTorrent website. A month later Sunde cancelled BOiNK, citing the many new music websites created since the downfall of OiNK. A Mac dashboard widget was released in December, listing "top 10 stuff currently on TPB, either per category or the full list". SlopsBox, a disposable email address anti-spam service, also appeared in December, and was reviewed in 2009.

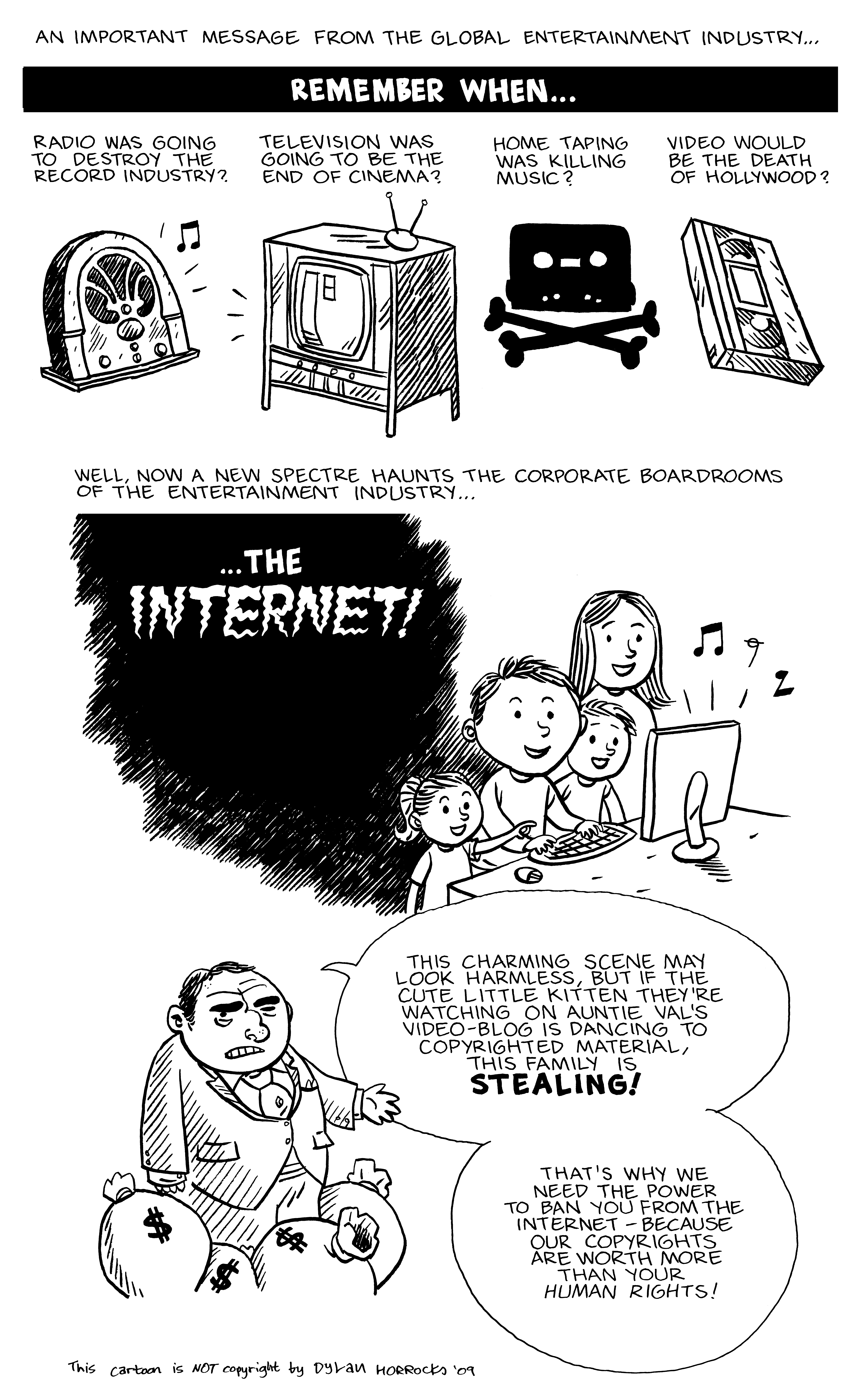
Political cartoon criticising the entertainment industry on the main page of TPB

In 2008, Baywords was launched as a free blogging service that lets users of the site blog about anything as long as it does not break any Swedish laws. In December, The Pirate Bay resurrected ShareReactor as a combined eD2k and BitTorrent site. The same month, the Vio mobile video converter was released, designed to convert video files for playback on mobile devices such as iPhone, BlackBerry, Android, many Nokia and Windows Mobile devices.

In 2009, Pastebay, a note sharing service similar to Pastebin, was made available to the public as of 23 March. The Video Bay video streaming/sharing site was announced in June to be "The YouTube Killer", with content viewable in HTML 5-capable browsers. The site was in an "Extreme Beta" phase; a message on the homepage instructed the user "don't expect anything to work at all". The Video Bay was never completed and as of 28 April 2013, The Video Bay is inaccessible.

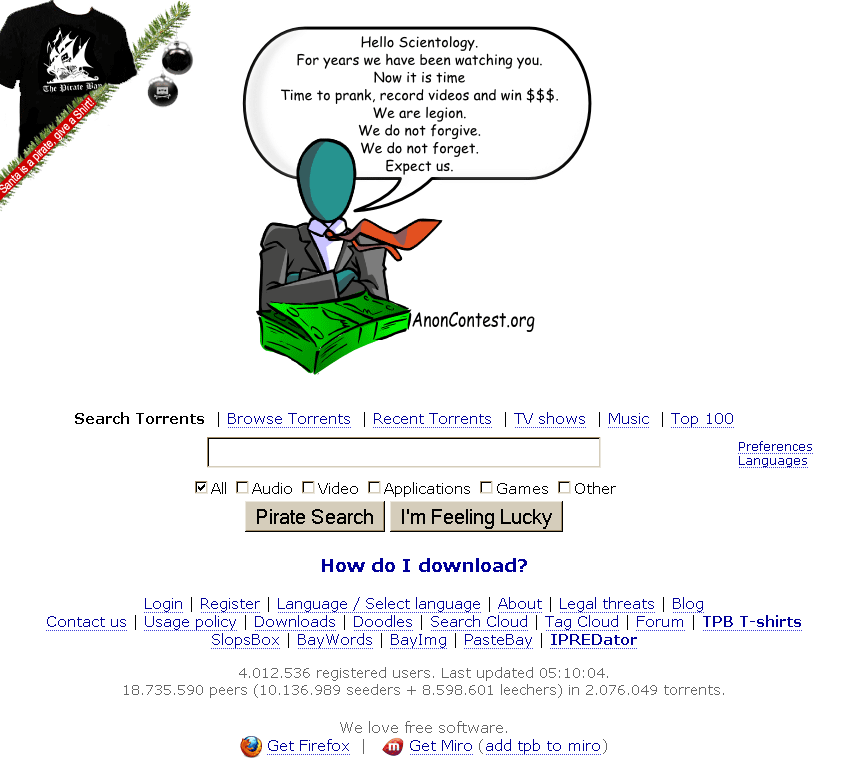
A contest by Project Chanology advertised at The Pirate Bay in December 2009

On 18 April 2011, Pirate Bay temporarily changed its name to "Research Bay", collaborating with P2P researchers of the Lund University Cybernorms group in a large poll of P2P users. The researchers published their results online on "The Survey Bay", as a public Creative Commons project in 2013. In January 2012, the site announced The Promo Bay; "doodles" by selected musicians, artists and others could be rotated onto the site's front page at a future date. Brazilian novelist Paulo Coelho was promoted, offering a collection of his books for free download. By November, 10,000 artists were reported to have signed up. TPB preserves a dated collection of exhibited logos. On 2 December 2012, some ISPs in the UK such as BT, Virgin Media, and BE started blocking The Promo Bay but stopped a few days later when the BPI reversed its position.

=== Purchases ===
In January 2007, when the micronation of Sealand was put up for sale, the ACFI and The Pirate Bay tried to buy it. The Sealand government, however, did not want to be involved with The Pirate Bay, as it was their opinion that file sharing represented "theft of proprietary rights". A new plan was formed to buy an island instead, but this too was never implemented, despite the website having raised US$25,000 (€15,000) in donations for this cause.

The P2P news blog TorrentFreak reported on 12 October 2007 that the Internet domain ifpi.com, which previously belonged to the International Federation of the Phonographic Industry, an anti-piracy organisation, had been acquired by The Pirate Bay. When asked about how they got hold of the domain, Sunde told TorrentFreak, "It's not a hack, someone just gave us the domain name. We have no idea how they got it, but it's ours and we're keeping it." The website was renamed "The International Federation of Pirates Interests" However, the IFPI filed a complaint with the World Intellectual Property Organization shortly thereafter, which subsequently ordered The Pirate Bay to return the domain name to the IFPI.

=== Cryptocurrency ===
On 12 May 2021, The Pirate Bay launched Pirate Token, a BEP-20 token, to be used to sustain its community and develop tools for the website.

== Incidents ==
=== May 2006 raid ===
On 31 May 2006, a raid against The Pirate Bay and people involved with the website took place as ordered by Swedish judge Tomas Norström, later the presiding judge of the 2009 trial, prompted by allegations of copyright violations. Police officers shut down the website and confiscated its servers, as well as all other servers hosted by The Pirate Bay's Internet service provider, PRQ. The company is owned by two operators of The Pirate Bay. Three people – Neij, Svartholm and Mikael Viborg – were held by the police for questioning, but were released later that evening. All servers in the room were seized, including those running the website of Piratbyrån, an independent organisation fighting for file sharing rights, as well as servers unrelated to The Pirate Bay or other file sharing activities. Equipment such as hardware routers, switches, blank CDs, and fax machines were also seized.

The Motion Picture Association of America (MPAA) wrote in a press release: "Since filing a criminal complaint in Sweden in November 2004, the film industry has worked vigorously with Swedish and U.S. government officials in Sweden to shut this illegal website down." MPAA CEO Dan Glickman also stated, "Intellectual property theft is a problem for film industries all over the world and we are glad that the local government in Sweden has helped stop The Pirate Bay from continuing to enable rampant copyright theft on the Internet." The MPAA press release set forth its justification for the raid and claimed that there were three arrests; however, the individuals were not actually arrested, only held for questioning. The release also reprinted John G. Malcolm's allegation that The Pirate Bay was making money from the distribution of copyrighted material, a criticism denied by The Pirate Bay.

After the raid, The Pirate Bay displayed a message that confirmed that the Swedish police had executed search warrants for breach of copyright law or assisting such a breach. The closure message initially caused some confusion because on 1 April 2005, April Fools' Day, The Pirate Bay had posted a similar message as a prank, stating that they were unavailable due to a raid by the Swedish Anti-Piracy Bureau and IFPI. Piratbyrån set up a temporary news blog to inform the public about the incident. On 2 June 2006, The Pirate Bay was available once again, with their logo depicting a pirate ship firing cannonballs at the Hollywood Sign. The Pirate Bay has servers in both Belgium and Russia for future use in case of another raid. According to The Pirate Bay, in the two years following the raid, it grew from 1 million to 2.7 million registered users and from 2.5 million to 12 million peers. The Pirate Bay claimed over 5 million active users in 2007.

Sweden's largest technology museum, the Swedish National Museum of Science and Technology, acquired one of the confiscated servers in 2009 and exhibited it for having great symbolic value as a "big problem or a big opportunity".

=== Autopsy photos ===
In September 2008, the Swedish media reported that the public preliminary investigation protocols concerning a child murder case known as the Arboga case had been made available through a torrent on The Pirate Bay. In Sweden, preliminary investigations became publicly available the moment a lawsuit is filed and can be ordered from the court by any individual. The document included pictures from the autopsy of the two murdered children, which caused their father Nicklas Jangestig to urge the website to have the pictures removed. The Pirate Bay refused to remove the torrent. The number of downloads increased to about 50,000 a few days later. On 11 September 2008, Sunde participated in the debate program Debatt on the public broadcaster SVT. He had agreed to participate on the condition that the children's father, Nicklas Jangestig, would not take part in the debate. Jangestig ultimately did participate in the program by telephone, which made Sunde feel betrayed by SVT. This caused The Pirate Bay to suspend all of its press contacts the following day. "I don't think it's our job to judge if something is ethical or unethical or what other people want to put out on the internet", Sunde said to TV4.

=== Legal issues ===
In September 2007, a large number of internal emails were leaked from anti-piracy company MediaDefender by an anonymous hacker. Some of the leaked emails discussed hiring hackers to perform DDoS attacks on The Pirate Bay's servers and trackers. In response to the leak, The Pirate Bay filed charges in Sweden against MediaDefender clients Twentieth Century Fox Sweden AB, EMI Sweden AB, Universal Music Group Sweden AB, Universal Pictures Nordic AB, Paramount Home Entertainment (Sweden) AB, Atari Nordic AB, Activision Nordic, Ubisoft Sweden AB, Sony BMG Music Entertainment (Sweden) AB, and Sony Pictures Home Entertainment Nordic AB, but the charges were not pursued. MediaDefender's stocks fell sharply after this incident, and several media companies withdrew from the service after the company announced the leak had caused $825,000 in losses.

Later, Sunde accused police investigator Jim Keyzer of a conflict of interest when he declined to investigate MediaDefender. Keyzer later accepted a job for MPAA member studio Warner Brothers. The leaked emails revealed that other MPAA member studios hired MediaDefender to pollute The Pirate Bay's torrent database. In an official letter to the Swedish Minister of Justice, the International Olympic Committee (IOC) requested assistance from the Swedish government to prevent The Pirate Bay from distributing video clips of the Beijing Olympics. The IOC claimed there were more than one million downloads of footage from the Olympics – mostly of the opening ceremony. The Pirate Bay, however, did not take anything down, and temporarily renamed the website to The Beijing Bay.

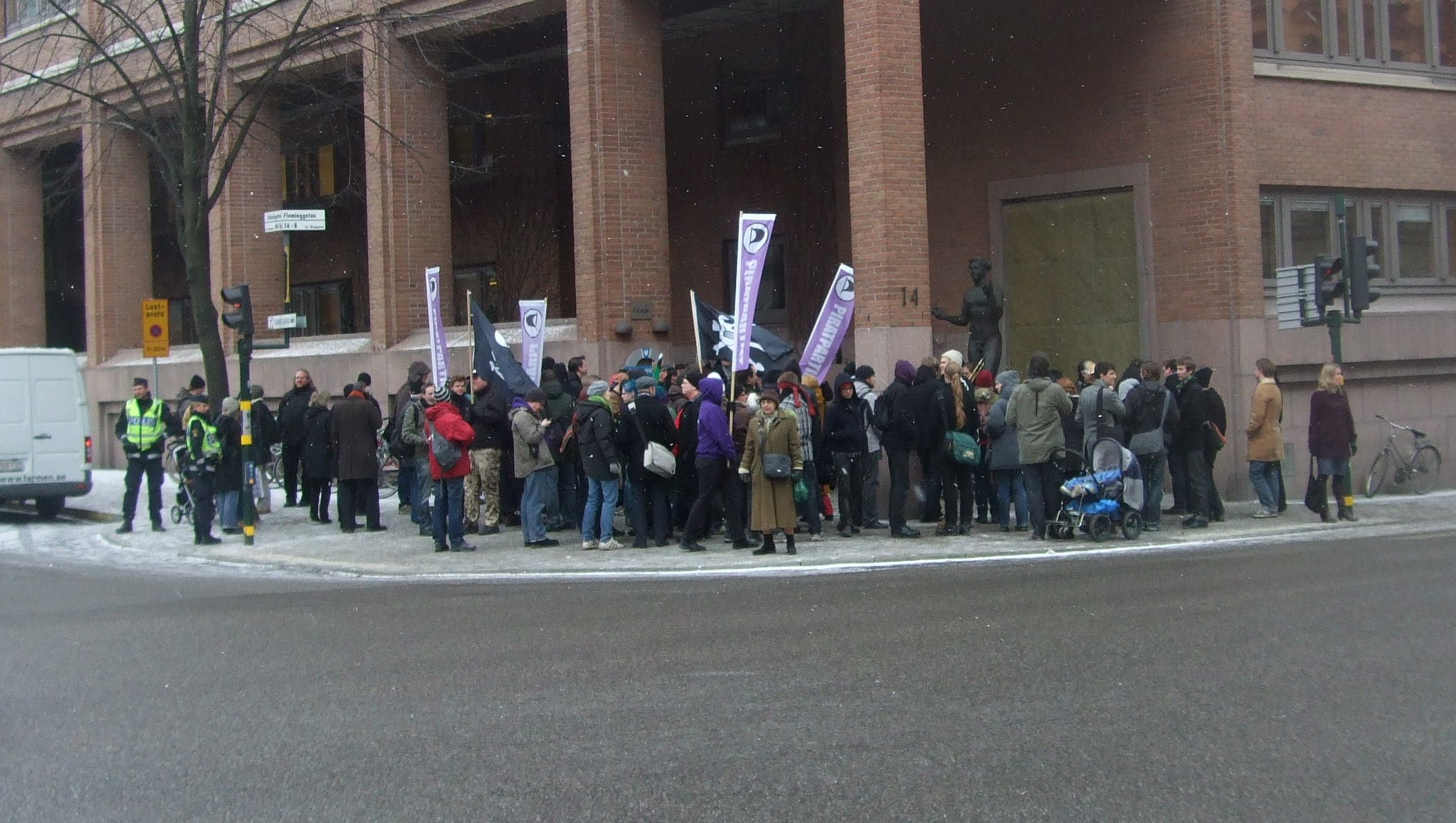
Protestors showing support for The Pirate Bay on the first day of the trial

The trial against the men behind the Pirate Bay started in Sweden on 16 February 2009. They were accused of breaking Swedish copyright law. The defendants, however, continued to be confident about the outcome. Half the charges against The Pirate Bay were dropped on the second day of the trial.

The three operators of the site and their one investor Carl Lundström were convicted in Stockholm district court on 17 April 2009 and sentenced to one year in jail each and a total of 30 million kronor ($3.6 million, €2.7 million, £2.4 million sterling) in fines and damages. The defendants' lawyers appealed to the Svea Court of Appeal and requested a retrial in the district court, alleging bias on the part of judge Tomas Norström.

On 13 May 2009, several record companies again sued The Pirate Bay's founders as well as their main internet service provider Black Internet. They required enforcement for ending The Pirate Bay's accessory to copyright infringement that had not stopped despite the court order in April, and in the complaint listed several pages of works being shared with the help of the site. The suit was joined by several major film companies on 30 July. The Stockholm district court ruled on 21 August that Black Internet must stop making available the specific works mentioned in the judgment, or face a 500,000 kronor fine. The company was notified of the order on 24 August, and they complied with it on the same day by disconnecting The Pirate Bay. Computer Sweden noted that the judgment did not order The Pirate Bay to be disconnected, but the ISP had no other option for stopping the activity on the site. It was the first time in Sweden for an ISP to be forced to stop providing access for a website. A public support fund fronted by the CEO of the ISP was set up to cover the legal fees of an appeal. Pirate Party leader Rickard Falkvinge submitted the case for Parliamentary Ombudsman review, criticising the court's order to make intermediaries responsible for relayed content and to assign active crime prevention tasks to a private party.

On 28 October 2009, the Stockholm District Court ordered a temporary injunction on Neij and Svartholm with a penalty of 500,000 kronor each, forbidding them from participating in the operation of The Pirate Bay's website or trackers.

On 21 May 2010, the Svea Court of Appeal decided not to change the orders on Black Internet or Neij and Svartholm.

On 1 February 2012, the Supreme Court of Sweden refused to hear an appeal in the conviction case, and agreed with the decision of the Svea Court of Appeal, which had upheld the sentences in November 2011.

On 2 September 2012, Svartholm was arrested in Cambodia. He was detained in Phnom Penh by officers executing an international warrant issued against him in April after he did not turn up to serve a one-year jail sentence for copyright violations. On 24 December 2012, administrators of TPB changed the homepage to urge users to send Warg, in jail, "gifts and letters".

In March 2013, The Pirate Bay claimed in a blog post that it had moved its servers to North Korea. The incident turned out to be a hoax. In April 2013, within a week The Pirate Bay had moved its servers from Greenland to Iceland to St. Martin, either in response to legal threats or preemptively. In December 2013, the site changed its domain to .ac (Ascension Island), following the seizure of the .sx domain. On 12 December, the site moved to .pe (Peru), on 18 December to .gy (Guyana). Following the site's suspension from the .gy domain, on 19 December The Pirate Bay returned to .se (Sweden), which it had previously occupied between February 2012 and April 2013.

=== Trial ===
The Pirate Bay trial was a joint criminal and civil prosecution in Sweden of four individuals charged for promoting the copyright infringement of others with The Pirate Bay site. The criminal charges were supported by a consortium of intellectual rights holders led by IFPI, who filed individual civil compensation claims against the owners of The Pirate Bay.

Swedish prosecutors filed charges on 31 January 2008 against the founders along with Carl Lundström, a Swedish businessman who through his businesses sold services to the site. The prosecutor claimed the four worked together to administer, host, and develop the site and thereby facilitated other people's breach of copyright law. Some 34 cases of copyright infringements were originally listed, of which 21 were related to music files, 9 to movies, and 4 to games. One case involving music files was later dropped by the copyright holder who made the file available again on The Pirate Bay site. In addition, claims for damages of 117 million kronor ($13 million, €12.5 million) were filed. The case was decided jointly by a judge and three appointed lay judges. According to Swedish media, the lead judge, judge Norström, was a member of the Swedish Copyright Association and sat on the board of the Swedish Association for the Protection of Industrial Property, but denied that his involvement constituted a conflict of interest.

The trial started on 16 February 2009, in the district court (tingsrätt) of Stockholm, Sweden. The hearings ended on 3 March 2009 and the verdict was announced at 11:00 am on Friday 17 April 2009: Neij, Sunde, Svartholm and Lundström were all found guilty and sentenced to serve one year in prison and pay a fine of 30 million Swedish krona (app. €2.7 million or US$3.5 million). All of the defendants appealed the verdict.

The appeal trial concluded on 15 October 2010, and the verdict was announced on 26 November. The appeal court shortened sentences of three of the defendants who appeared in court that day. Neij's sentence was reduced to 10 months, Sunde's to eight, and Lundström's to four. However, the fine was increased from 32 to 46 million kronor.

On 1 February 2012, the Supreme Court of Sweden refused to hear an appeal in the case, prompting the site to change its official domain name to thepiratebay.se from thepiratebay.org. The move to a .se domain was claimed to prevent susceptibility to US laws from taking control of the site. On 9 April 2013, the site changed its domain name to thepiratebay.gl, under the Greenland TLD, in anticipation of possible seizure by Swedish authorities of its .se domain. The change proved to be short lived, as the site returned to the .se domain on 12 April 2013 after being blocked on the .gl domain by Tele-Post, which administers domains in Greenland. Tele-Post cited a Danish court ruling that the site was in violation of copyright laws.

The founders were all released after having finished serving their sentences by 2015.

=== Service issues ===
In May 2007, The Pirate Bay was attacked by a group of hackers. They copied the user database, which included over 1.5 million users. The Pirate Bay claimed to its users that the data was of no value and that passwords and e-mails were encrypted and hashed. Some blogs stated that a group known as the AUH (Arga Unga Hackare, Swedish for "Angry Young Hackers") were suspected of executing the attack; however, the AUH stated on the Computer Sweden newspaper that they were not involved and would take revenge on those responsible for the attack.

On 27 April 2009, the website of The Pirate Bay had fibre IPv4 connectivity issues. There was widespread speculation this was a forced outage from the Swedish anti-piracy group, accelerated somewhat by TPB adding contact details for the Swedish anti-piracy group's lawyers to its RIPE database record. The site and its forums were still available via IPv6 at the time.

On 24 August 2009, one of The Pirate Bay's upstream providers was ordered to discontinue service for the website by a Swedish court in response to a civil action brought by several entertainment companies including Disney, Universal, Time Warner, Columbia, Sony, NBC, and Paramount. According to the TPB Blog, this caused a downtime of 3 hours; however, some users were unable to access the site immediately following the relocation due to unrelated technical difficulties. The site was fully operational again for everyone within 24 hours.

On 6 October 2009, one of the IP transit providers to The Pirate Bay blocked all Pirate Bay traffic causing an outage for most users around the world. The same day, the site was reportedly back online at an IP address at CyberBunker, located in the Netherlands. It is not known whether The Pirate Bay is actually located at CyberBunker or whether they are using the CyberBunker service that routes CyberBunker IP addresses to any datacenter around the world. These routes are not visible to the outside world.

CyberBunker was given a court injunction on 17 May 2010, taking the site offline briefly; later that day, hosting was restored by Sweden's Pirate Party. Now former spokesman Sunde commented that it would now be very difficult to stop the site because it would now be seen as political censorship if anyone tries to shut it down.

On 8 July 2010, a group of Argentine hackers gained access to The Pirate Bay's administration panel through a security breach via the backend of The Pirate Bay website. They were able to delete torrents and expose users' IP-addresses, emails and MD5-hashed passwords. The Pirate Bay was taken offline for upgrades. Users visiting the website were met by the following message: "Upgrading some stuff, database is in use for backups, soon back again. Btw, it's nice weather outside I think."

On 16 May 2012, The Pirate Bay experienced a major DDoS attack, causing the site to be largely inaccessible worldwide for around 24 hours. The Pirate Bay said that it did not know who was behind the attack, although it "had its suspicions".

On 5 May 2015, The Pirate Bay went offline for several hours, apparently as a result of not properly configuring its SSL certificate.

=== Acquisition discussion ===
On 30 June 2009, Swedish advertising company Global Gaming Factory X AB announced their intention to buy the site for 60 million kronor (approximately US$8.5 million) (30 million kronor in cash, 30 million kronor in GGF shares).

The Pirate Bay founders stated that the profits from the sale would be placed in an offshore account where it would be used to fund projects pertaining to "freedom of speech, freedom of information, and the openness of the Internet". Assurances were made that "no personal data will be transferred in the eventual sale (since no personal data is kept)." Global Gaming Chief Executive Hans Pandeya commented on the site's future by saying "We would like to introduce models which entail that content providers and copyright owners get paid for content that is downloaded via the site", and announced that users would be charged a monthly fee for access to The Pirate Bay.

Global Gaming Factory's letter of intent expired at the end of September 2009, without the transaction having taken place. This may be due to the company's financial difficulties. "PC World" magazine regarded the deal's future as "doomed".

=== December 2014 raid ===
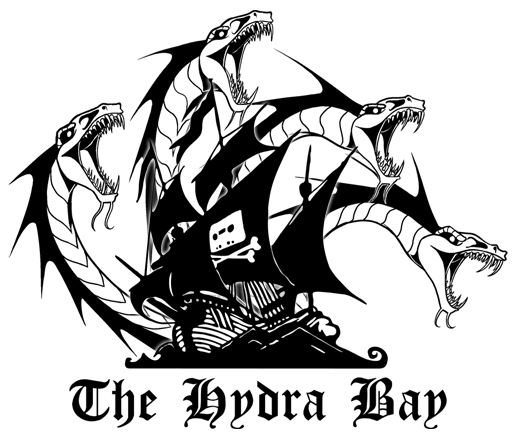
The Hydra Bay logo; occasionally displayed on the official website

On 9 December 2014, police in Stockholm raided the company's premises and seized servers and other computers and equipment, which resulted in the website going offline. The raid was in response to a complaint from Rights Alliance, a Swedish anti-piracy group. The Pirate Bay was one of many peer-to-peer and torrent-related websites and apps that went down. One member of the crew was arrested. Torrent Freak reported that most other torrent sites reported a 5–10% increase in traffic from the displaced users, though the shutdown had little effect on overall piracy levels. In retaliation to the raid, a group of hackers claiming to be part of Anonymous allegedly leaked email log-in details of Swedish government officials. Sunde commented in a blog post that he was happy to see the website shut down, believing his successors have done nothing to improve the site, criticising in particular the increased use of advertisements.

IsoHunt has since copied much of the original TPB database and made it accessible through oldpiratebay.org, a searchable index of old Pirate Bay torrents. IsoHunt also released a tool called The Open Bay, to allow users to deploy their own version of the Pirate Bay website. The tool is responsible for around 372 mirror sites. Since 17 December 2014, The Pirate Bay's Facebook page has been unavailable. On 22 December 2014, a website was resumed at the domain thepiratebay.se, showing a flip clock with the length of time in days and hours that the site had been offline, and a waving pirate flag. From this day TPB was hosted for a period in Moldova, on Trabia Network (Moldo-German company) servers. The Pirate Bay then began using the services of CloudFlare, a company which offers reverse proxy services. On 1 January 2015, the website presented a countdown to 1 February 2015. The website returned with a prominent phoenix logo displayed at the domain thepiratebay.se on 31 January 2015.

=== Error 522 downtimes ===
Beginning in October 2018, the clearnet Pirate Bay website started to be inaccessible in some locations around the world, showing Error 522. As the result, direct visits to the website dropped by more than 32 percent in October. The incident was found to be unrelated to internet provider blocking or domain name problem, but the exact cause has not been determined. The site's Tor domain and proxies remained unaffected.

The Error 522 problem occurred again in early March 2020, with the site's admins unable to say when it would be resolved. After one month, the site's functionality was restored with an update of the domain records and the Cloudflare nameservers.

== Censorship and controversies ==
=== Anti-copyright movement ===
The Pirate Bay has sparked controversies and discussion about legal aspects of file sharing, copyright, and civil liberties and has become a platform for political initiatives against established intellectual property laws and a central figure in an anti-copyright movement. The website faced several shutdowns and domain seizures which "did little to take the site offline, as it simply switched to a series of new web addresses and continued to operate".

=== Domain blocking by countries ===
The Pirate Bay's website has been blocked in some countries, despite the relative ease by which such blocks can be circumvented in most countries. While the URL to the Pirate Bay itself has been blocked in these countries, numerous mirror websites emerged to make the website available at different URLs, routing traffic around the block.

According to Google chairman Eric Schmidt, "government plans to block access to illicit filesharing websites could set a 'disastrous precedent' for freedom of speech"; he also expressed that Google would "fight attempts to restrict access to sites such as the Pirate Bay".

==== Sweden ====
On 13 February 2017, Sweden's Patent and Market Court of Appeal decided that the broadband provider Bredbandsbolaget must block its customers from accessing file sharing site The Pirate Bay, overruling a district court ruling to the contrary from 2015. This is the first time a site was openly blocked in Sweden. The rest of the ISPs are expected to follow the same court orders.

The ISP Telia was mandated to block the Pirate Bay through a dynamic injunction on 12 December 2019. This means that when the rights holders find a website (IP and URL for the Pirate Bay) they can inform Telia who are legally required to block it in 2–3 weeks. Telia objected to this blocking order and attempted to appeal the injunction but lost on 29 June 2020 and must maintain the dynamic injunction for 3 years.

=== Censorship by corporations ===
==== Facebook ====
After The Pirate Bay introduced a feature in March 2009 to easily share links to torrents on the social networking site Facebook, Wired found in May that Facebook had started blocking the links. On further inspection, they discovered that all messages containing links to The Pirate Bay in both public and in private messages, regardless of content, were being blocked. Electronic Frontier Foundation lawyers commented that Facebook might be working against the US Electronic Communications Privacy Act by intercepting user messages, but Facebook chief privacy officer Chris Kelly said that they have the right to use blocks on links where there is a "demonstrated disregard for intellectual property rights", following users' agreement on their terms of service. Links to other similar sites have not been blocked.

==== Microsoft ====
In March 2012, Microsoft blocked Windows Live Messenger messages containing links to The Pirate Bay. When a user sends an instant message that contains a link to The Pirate Bay, Windows Live Messenger prompts a warning and claims "Blocked as it was reported unsafe". "We block instant messages if they contain malicious or spam URLs based on intelligence algorithms, third-party sources, or user complaints. Pirate Bay URLs were flagged by one or more of these and were consequently blocked", Microsoft told The Register in an emailed statement.

==== Google ====
In late November 2021, Google removed The Pirate Bay and more than 100 related domains from its search results in the Netherlands due to the Dutch court order. Two years later, in December 2023, the link to The Pirate Bay was removed from Google Knowledge Panel.

== In media ==
The Pirate Bay is featured in Steal This Film (2006), a documentary series about society and filesharing, produced by The League of Noble Peers; in the Danish Documentary Good Copy Bad Copy, which explores the issues surrounding file copyright; and the documentary TPB AFK. The Pirate Bay has been a topic on the US-syndicated NPR radio show On the Media.

Björn Ulvaeus, member of the Swedish pop music group ABBA, criticised copyright infringing activities of The Pirate Bay supporters as "lazy and mean". In contrast, Brazilian best-selling author Paulo Coelho has embraced free sharing online. Coelho supports The Pirate Bay and offered to be a witness in the 2009 trial. He accounts much of his growing sales to his work shared on the Internet and comments that "a person who does not share is not only selfish, but bitter and alone".

== See also ==
- Comparison of BitTorrent sites
- Copyleft – Preservation of legal rights in the reuse of a work
- Criticism of copyright – Dissenting views of copyright law
- Home Taping Is Killing Music – Anti-copyright infringement slogan
- Internet freedom – Digital rights, freedom of information and the right to Internet access and speech
- IPredator – Virtual private network service
- Njalla – Anonymous domain registrar, hosting and VPN provider
- Piracy is theft – Slogan against copyright infringement
- Pirate Party – Type of political party
- Sci-Hub – Network of pirated research papers, "Sci-Hub can instantly provide access to more than two-thirds of all scholarly articles"
- Steal This Film – 2006 film series on piracy culture
