= Public-domain software =

Software in the public domain

The Creative Commons Public Domain Mark indicates works that are in the public domain

Public-domain software is software that has been placed in the public domain, in other words, software for which there is absolutely no ownership such as copyright, trademark, or patent. Software in the public domain can be modified, distributed, or sold even without any attribution by anyone; this is unlike the common case of software under exclusive copyright, where licenses grant limited usage rights. As result, public-domain software has all the four freedoms of free software but is not hampered by the complexities of attribution (restriction of permissive licensed software) or license compatibility (issue with copyleft licensed software).

Under the Berne Convention, which most countries have signed, an author automatically obtains the exclusive copyright to anything they have written, and local law may similarly grant copyright, patent, or trademark rights by default. The Convention also covers programs, and they are therefore automatically subject to copyright. Thus, to release a work into the public domain, the author must take explicit action to give up these exclusive rights; procedures and limitations on this process vary by jurisdiction.

== History ==
=== Early academic public-domain software ecosystem ===
From the software culture of the 1950s to 1990s, public-domain (or PD) software were popular as original academic phenomena. This kind of freely distributed and shared "free software" combined the present-day classes of freeware, shareware, and free and open-source software, and was created in academia, by hobbyists, and hackers. As software was often written in an interpreted language such as BASIC, the source code was needed and therefore distributed to run the software. PD software was also shared and distributed as printed source code (type-in programs) in computer magazines (like Creative Computing, SoftSide, Compute!, Byte, etc.) and books, like the bestseller BASIC Computer Games. Earlier on, closed-source software was uncommon until the mid-1970s to 1980s.

Before 1974, when the US Commission on New Technological Uses of Copyrighted Works (CONTU) decided that "computer programs, to the extent that they embody an author's original creation, are proper subject matter of copyright", software was not copyrightable and therefore always in the public domain. This legislation, plus court decisions such as Apple v. Franklin in 1983 for object code, clarified that the Copyright Act gave computer programs the copyright status of literary works.

In the 1980s, a common way to share public-domain software was by receiving them through a local user group or a company like PC-SIG of Sunnyvale, California, which maintained a mail-order catalog of more than 300 disks with an average price of US$6. Public-domain software with source code was also shared on BBS networks. Public-domain software was commercialized sometimes by a donationware model, asking the users for a financial donation to be sent by mail.

The public-domain "free sharing" and donationware commercialization models evolved in the following years to the (non-voluntary) shareware model, and software free of charge, called freeware. Additionally, due to other changes in the computer industry, the sharing of source code became less common.

With the Berne Convention Implementation Act of 1988 (and the earlier Copyright Act of 1976), the legal basis for public-domain software changed drastically. Before the act, releasing software without a copyright notice was enough to dedicate it to the public domain. With the new act, software was by default copyright-protected and needed an explicit waiver statement or license from the author.

Reference implementations of algorithms, often cryptographic meant or applied for standardization are still often released into the public domain; examples include CERN httpd in 1993 and Serpent cipher in 1999. The Openwall Project maintains a list of several algorithms and their source code in the public domain.

=== Free and open-source software as successor ===
As a response of the academic software ecosystem to the change in the copyright system in the late 1980s, permissive license texts were developed, like the BSD license and its derivatives. Permissive-licensed software, which is a kind of free and open-source software, shares most characteristics of earlier public-domain software but stands on the legal basis of copyright law.

In the 1980s Richard Stallman, who for long worked in an academic environment of "public-domain"-like software sharing, noticed the emergence of proprietary software and the decline of the public-domain software ecosystem. In an effort to preserve this ecosystem he created a software license, the GPL, which encodes the public-domain rights and enforces them irrevocably on software. Paradoxically, his copyleft approach relies on the enforceability of the copyright to be effective. Copyleft free software, therefore, shares many properties with public-domain software, but does not allow relicensing or sublicensing. Unlike real public-domain software or permissive-licensed software, Stallman's copyleft license tries to enforce the free shareability of software also for the future by not allowing license changes.

To refer to free software (which is under a free software license) or to software distributed and usable free of charge (freeware) as "public-domain" is therefore incorrect. While public domain gives up the author's exclusive rights (e.g. copyright), in free software the author's copyright is still retained and used, for instance, to enforce copyleft or to hand out permissive-licensed software. Licensed software is in general not in the public domain. Another distinct difference is that an executable program may be in the public domain even if its source code is not made available (making the program not feasibly modifiable), while free software always has the source code available.

=== Post-copyright public domain ===
With the 2000s and the emergence of peer-to-peer sharing networks and sharing in web development, a new copyright-critical generation of developers made the "license-free" public-domain software model visible again, also criticizing the FOSS license ecosystem ("Post Open Source") as stabilizing part of the copyright system. New non-FOSS licenses and waiver texts were developed, notably the Creative Commons "CC0" (2009) and the "Unlicense" (2010), and there was a noticeable rise in the popularity of permissive software licenses. Also, the growing problem of orphaned software and digital obsolescence of software raised awareness of the relevance of again passing software into the public domain for better preservation of the digital heritage, unrestricted by copyright and digital rights management.

Around 2004, there was debate on whether public-domain software could be considered part of the FOSS ecosystem, as argued by lawyer Lawrence Rosen in the essay "Why the public domain isn't a license", a position that faced opposition by Daniel J. Bernstein and others. In 2012, the status was finally resolved when Rosen changed his mind and accepted the CC0 as an open-source license, while admitting that, contrary to previous claims, copyright could be waived, as backed by a Ninth Circuit decision.

== Passing of software into the public domain ==
Software can fall into the public domain by multiple mechanisms.

=== Release without copyright notice ===
Before the Berne Convention Implementation Act of 1988 (and the earlier Copyright Act of 1976, which went into effect in 1978) works could be easily given into the public domain by releasing them without an explicit copyright notice and no copyright registration. After 1988, all works were by default copyright-protected and needed to be actively given into the public domain by a waiver statement.

=== Ineligibility for copyright ===
In some jurisdictions, certain software is ineligible for copyright protection and is thus automatically in the public domain. For example, under United States copyright law, works authored by employees of the federal government are in the public domain.

=== Expiration of copyright ===
Copyrighted works, including software, are meant to pass into the public domain after their copyright term ends, losing their copyright privilege. As the Berne Convention grants decades-long copyright protection, in countries that signed it, copyright has not yet expired on any software. The question of how quickly works should pass into the public domain has been a matter of scientific and public debates, as well as for software like video games.

=== Explicit waiver of copyright ===
In some jurisdictions, an author or other copyright holder can dedicate a work to the public domain by explicitly disclaiming copyright and other rights over the work in some way, e.g. by a waiver statement. Waiver of copyright is recognized in the United States.

In some jurisdictions, some rights (in particular moral rights) cannot be disclaimed: for instance, civil tradition-based German law's "Urheberrecht" differs from Anglo-Saxon common law tradition's "copyright" concept.

=== Public-domain-like licenses ===
WTFPL license logo, a public-domain-like license

CC0 license logo, a copyright waiver, and public-domain-like license

While real public domain makes software licenses unnecessary, as no owner/author is required to grant permission ("Permission culture"), there are licenses that grant public-domain-like rights. There is no universally agreed-upon license, but there are multiple licenses that aim to release source code into the public domain.

In 2000 the WTFPL was released as a public-domain-like license/waiver/anti-copyright notice. The Unlicense, published around 2010, has a focus on an anti-copyright message. The Unlicense offers a public domain waiver text with a fallback public-domain-like license inspired by permissive licenses but without attribution clause. In 2015, GitHub reported that of the approximately 5.1 million licensed projects it hosted, almost 2% used the Unlicense. Another popular option is the Zero Clause BSD license, released in 2006 and aimed at software. In 2020 the MIT No Attribution (MIT-0) license was approved by the Open Source Initiative, forming another option for a public-domain-equivalent license.

Creative Commons licenses are not designed for software, and Creative Commons has always discouraged their use for software. The Creative Commons released the CC0 public domain dedication in 2009. It was crafted for compatibility with various law domains (e.g. civil law of continental Europe) where dedicating to public domain is problematic. This is achieved by a public domain waiver statement and a fallback all-permissive license, in case the waiver is not possible. The license was considered but not approved by the Open Source Initiative. The Free Software Foundation and the Open Source Initiative do not recommend the usage of this license for software due to inclusion of a clause expressly stating it does not grant patent licenses. A 2018 conference paper asserted that "software released under CC0 is not open-source software."

== Public-domain software ==
See also Category:Public-domain software with source code, Category:Public-domain software

=== Classical PD software (pre-1988) ===
Public domain software in the early computer age was, for instance, shared as type-in programs in computer magazines and books like BASIC Computer Games. Explicit PD waiver statements or license files were at that time unusual. Publicly available software without a copyright notice was assumed to be, and shared as, public-domain software.

Notable general PD software from that time include:

- ELIZA (1966)
- SPICE (1973)
- BLAS (1979)
- FFTPACK (1985)

Video games are among the earliest examples of shared PD software, which are still notable today:

- Spacewar! (1962)
- Hamurabi (1969)
- Star Trek (1971)
- Hunt the Wumpus (1972)
- Maze War (1974)
- Colossal Cave Adventure (1976)
- Android Nim (1978)
- Rogue (1980)
- Ballerburg (1987)

Many PD software authors kept the practices of public-domain release without having a waiver text, not knowing or caring for the changed copyright law, thus creating a legal problem. On the other hand, magazines started in the mid-1980s to claim copyright even for type-in programs that were previously seen as PD. Only slowly did PD software authors start to include explicit relinquishment or license statement texts.

=== Examples of modern PD software (post 1988) ===
Early versions (before 1995) of the Persian word processor Zarnegar are in the public domain because Iran has a copyright term of thirty years from publication on works owned by a legal entity and has not signed international copyright agreements.

The below examples of modern PD software (after the Berne Convention Implementation Act of 1988) are either under proper public domain (e.g. created by a US governmental organization), under a proper public domain like license (for instance CC0), or accompanied by a clear waiver statement from the author. Whilst not as widespread as in the pre-2000s, PD software still exists nowadays. For example, SourceForge listed 334 hosted PD projects in 2016, and GitHub 102,000 under the Unlicense alone in 2015. In 2016, an analysis of the Fedora Project's packages revealed PD was the seventh most popular "license".

The award-winning video game developer Jason Rohrer releases his works into the PD, as do several cryptographers, such as Daniel J. Bernstein, Bruce Schneier and Douglas Crockford, with reference implementations of cryptographic algorithms.

- BLAST (1990)
- pdksh (1993)
- CERN's httpd (1993)
- ImageJ (1997)
- Serpent (cipher) (1999)
- SQLite (2000)
- reStructuredText (2002)
- I2P (2003)
- TempleOS (2005)
- youtube-dl (2006)
- 7-Zip's LZMA SDK (2008)
- Diamond Trust of London (2012)
- Glitch (2013)
- The Castle Doctrine (2014)
- SHA-3 (2015)
- Duelyst (2016)
- One Hour One Life (2018)

== See also ==
- Public domain
- Public copyright license
- License-free software
- List of public domain projects
- Free and open-source software
- Abandonware
