= License-free software =

Software to be used without restrictions

License-free software is computer software that is not explicitly in the public domain, but the authors appear to intend free use, modification, distribution and distribution of the modified software, similar to the freedoms defined for free software.

== Examples ==
Examples of license-free software formerly included programs written by Daniel J. Bernstein, such as qmail, djbdns, daemontools, and ucspi-tcp. Bernstein held the copyright and distributed these works without license until 2007. From December 28, 2007, onwards, he started placing his software in the public domain with an explicit waiver statement.

Additionally, small scripts are frequently released without specifying a license. For example, the website Userscripts.org hosts more than 52,000 Greasemonkey user scripts, the majority of which have no specified license. Similarly, GitHub reported in 2015 that 85% of the projects it hosts are unlicensed.

== Rights for users ==
On his Software users' rights web page, Bernstein explains his belief that under the terms of copyright law itself software users are always allowed to modify software for their personal use, regardless of license agreements. He says "If you think you need a license from the copyright holder, you've been bamboozled by Microsoft. As long as you're not distributing the software, you have nothing to worry about."

He also says that software users are allowed to back up, compile, and run the software that they possess.

He further says that "since it's not copyright infringement for you to apply a patch, it's also not copyright infringement for someone to give you a patch," noting the case of Galoob v. Nintendo as precedent. Thus modified versions of license-free software can legally be distributed in source code form in whatever way that the original can, by distributing a patch alongside it.

== Reception and discussion ==
Advocates of license-free software, such as Bernstein, argue that software licenses are harmful because they restrict the freedom to use software, and copyright law provides enough freedom without the need for licenses. Though having some restrictions, these licenses allow certain actions that are disallowed by copyright laws in some jurisdictions. If a license tries to restrict an action allowed by a copyright system, by Bernstein's argument those restrictions can be ignored. In fact, Bernstein's "non-license" of verbatim retransmission of source code is very similar in nature.

Similar positions on licenses are voiced by Free culture activist Nina Paley in 2010.

In 2013 Luis Villa argued similarly negative about the license usage of "open source", when the small number projects licensed on GitHub were noticed, identifying a "Post Open Source movement against the (license) permission culture".

== See also ==
- Anti-copyright notice
- Post Open Source
- Public domain software
