= Philosophy of copyright =

Philosophy

The philosophy of copyright considers philosophical issues linked to copyright policy, and other jurisprudential problems that arise in legal systems' interpretation and application of copyright law.

One debate concerns the purpose of copyright. Some take the approach of looking for coherent justifications of established copyright systems, while others start with general ethical theories, such as utilitarianism and try to analyse policy through that lens. Another approach denies the meaningfulness of any ethical justification for existing copyright law, viewing it simply as a result (and perhaps an undesirable result) of political processes.

Another widely debated issue is the relationship between copyrights and other forms of "intellectual property", and material property. Most scholars of copyright agree that it can be called a kind of property, because it involves the exclusion of others from something. But there is disagreement about the extent to which that fact should allow the transportation of other beliefs and intuitions about material possessions.

There are many other philosophical questions which arise in the jurisprudence of copyright. They include such problems as determining when one work is "derived" from another, or deciding when information has been placed in a "tangible" or "material" form.

== Justifications for copyright ==
Legal scholars often approach copyright in search of a coherent ethical justification for its existence and character. This approach may seem to be backwards—it might make more sense to start with an objective and then examine the law against it—but it is widely practised. Thus, the normative or ethical theories that might naively be regarded as tests for copyright law to pass are often called "justifications" of it. Justifications for copyright can generally be approximated into two groups: deontological or consequentialist. Deontological justifications for copyright seek to justify copyright as a matter of rights or duty; they seek to assert a justification for copyright (or intellectual property more generally) on the basis that it is morally correct to do so. Contrariwise, consequentialist theories of copyright seek to justify or criticise copyright protection based on the consequences of that protection, by asserting or providing evidence that the protection of copyright produces some desirable effect. Examples of such theories include incentives theories that view intellectual property as a necessary way of incentivising the creation of new creative works.

=== Natural rights ===
Natural rights are linked to the logic of property. John Locke is often cited as an authority, although it is not clear that Locke actually viewed copyright as a natural right. Personality rights are the basis of German copyright law. This position regards copyrightable works to be extensions of the author's personality. The author is given certain powers to control those works on account of his or her connection to them.

=== Consequentialist theories ===
Consequentialist theories of copyright hold that we should have the laws that will produce the 'best' results for society. The most common consequentialist position is utilitarianism, which defines the 'best' situations to be those in which people are in total as happy or fulfilled as possible. Economists' analyses of copyright tend to follow this philosophical approach.

A related class of theories is called instrumentalism; it holds that copyright law must exist for clear, coherent and necessary purposes, without being so strict as to require that it maximise some kind of 'goodness' in its outcome.

Some copyright scholars believe that, regardless of contemporary advances in technology, copyright remains the fundamental way by which authors, sculptors, artists, musicians and others can fund the creation of new works, and that without a significant period of legal protection of their future income, many valuable books and artworks would not be created. They argue that the public interest is best served by repeated extension of copyright terms to encompass multiple generations beyond the copyright holder's life, as this increases the present value of the copyright, encouraging the creation for new works and making additional investments in older works (for example, the restoration of old movies) economically viable. Authors' heirs continue to profit if copyrights are enforced post-death and this provides a substantial incentive for continued fresh work even as authors age.

The modern, market-driven copyright system provides authors with independent financing (through royalties). Without a feasible way to recoup investments of creative time through copyright, there would be little economic incentive to produce and works would need to be motivated by a desire for fame from already affluent authors or those able to obtain patronage (with associated constraints on independence). Proponents of copyright dispute that copyright erodes precepts for creators to be able to build on published expression pointing to concepts such as Scènes à faire and Idea-expression divide. Copyright only protects the artist's expression of his/her work and not the ideas, systems, or factual information conveyed in it and thus artists are free to get ideas from copyrighted works.

Defenders of the present system of strong copyrights argue that it has been largely successful in financing the creation and distribution of a wide variety of works, especially those requiring significant labor and capital. Moderate scholars seem to support that view while recognizing the need for exceptions and limitations, such as the fair use doctrine. Notably, a substantial portion of the current U.S. Copyright Act (sections 107–120) is devoted to such exceptions and limitations.

==== Consequentialism in the United States ====
Article One of the United States Constitution authorizes Congress to "promote the Progress of Science and useful Arts, by securing for limited Times to Authors and Inventors the exclusive Right to their respective Writings and Discoveries".

Many authors thought that this wording would actually require U.S. copyright laws to serve the purpose of "promoting the progress of science and useful arts".

In the US in 2003 controversial changes implemented by the Sonny Bono Copyright Term Extension Act extending the length of copyright under U.S. copyright law by 20 years were challenged in the United States Supreme Court. However, the Court, in the case called Eldred v. Ashcroft, held, inter alia, that in placing existing and future copyrights in parity in the CTEA, Congress acted within its authority and did not transgress constitutional limitations. Other jurisdictions have enacted legislation to provide for similar extensions of the copyright term.

== Opposition to copyright ==
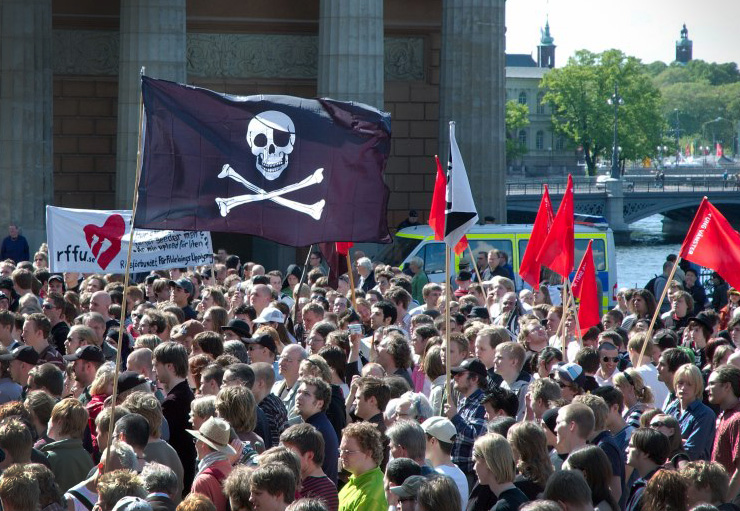
Anti-copyright demonstration in Stockholm, Sweden, 2006.

Critics of copyright as a whole fall broadly into two categories: Those who assert that the very concept of copyright has never benefited society, and has always served simply to enrich a few at the expense of creativity; and those who assert that the existing copyright regime must be reformed to maintain its relevance in the new Information society. The French droit d'auteur ("Rights of the Author"), which influenced the 1886 Berne Convention for the Protection of Literary and Artistic Works, must also be noted as a significant alternative to the usual Anglo-Saxon concept of copyright.

Among the latter group, there are also some who continue to agree with copyright as a way to grant authors rights, but feel that it "outlives its welcome" by granting copyright for too long (e.g., far beyond the lifetime of the author), and is therefore of little direct benefit to him or her. The prolongation of copyright term is commonly attributed to effective corporate lobbying, based on a desire for the continuance of a profitable monopoly. In the US, this is often phrased as a conspiracy to 'control the Mouse' (meaning Mickey Mouse, a trademarked character controlled by the Disney Company whose early works would have moved into the public domain save for such an extension).

To many critics, the general problem is that the current (international) copyright system undermines its own goal. The concepts of the public domain and the intrinsic freedom of information are necessary precepts for creators to be able to build on published expression. But these are gradually being eroded, as copyright terms are repeatedly extended to last beyond the lifetime of the audience which experienced and knows of the original work.

Another effect of the repeated extension of copyright term is that current authors are shielded from competition from a wide public domain: by the time current works enter the public domain, they will almost always have become obsolete. This reduces the risk of commoditization of topical non-fiction. Out-of-copyright publishing, such as classic literature where margins are very low, generally offers only the best of each genre.

Opposition to current copyright practice also relates to the non-observance of the principal requirement of the original Queen Anne Act, which specified that for a work to obtain copyright a copy had to be deposited in a library of record, so that unlimited copies could be made when the copyright expired. This was observed for many years but was later successfully opposed by the motion picture industry, which refused to provide copies of their films, resulting in the loss of many early films. Civilization experiences a similar loss of ancient documents from being held in private collections until they rot.

The recent success of free software projects such as Linux, Mozilla Firefox, and the Apache web server has demonstrated that quality works can be created even in the absence of a copyright-enforced monopoly rent. These products use copyright to enforce their license terms, which are designed to ensure the free nature of the work, rather than securing exclusive rights for the holder for monetary gain. Such licenses include copyleft, free software, and open source licenses.

Even in more traditional forms such as prose, some authors, such as Cory Doctorow, retain the copyright to their work but license it for free distribution (for example under a Creative Commons license). This has the benefit of providing a structured scheme under which authors can loosen some of the barriers that copyright imposes on others, allowing them to partially contribute the work to the community (in the form of giving a general grant on copying, reproduction, use or adaptation subject to certain conditions) while retaining other exclusive rights they hold in it.

Copyright can also be used to stifle political criticism. For example, in the US the contents of talk shows and similar programs are covered by copyright. Robert Greenwald, a director of Uncovered: The Whole Truth About the Iraq War documentary was refused the right to use a clip of a George W. Bush interview from NBC's Meet the Press. Although the fair use provisions of statute and common law may apply in such cases, the risks of loss in court should there be a lawsuit and pressure from insurance companies, who regard use of almost anything (e.g., three words forming the opening of a song,) without permission as too risky, usually precludes use of materials without explicit permission, and so without a license fee.

Copyright is also conceived by some to be an artificial barrier in that "expressions" could be freely exchanged between individuals and groups if there were no copyright or other legal restrictions preventing. Such people believe that as the state does not necessarily possess the moral authority to enact copyright laws, individuals may vary in their observation of such laws. Others disagree, believing that copyright (which in the United States system, for instance, arises from provisions in the U.S. Constitution), has made and continues to make a valuable even essential contribution to the creation and dissemination of works. They also point out the social dangers inherent in the view that each individual is entitled to judge the "moral authority" of laws and to observe them or not according to individual judgments.

== Modern challenges to copyright ==
Copyright concepts are under challenge in the modern era, primarily from the increasing use of peer-to-peer file sharing. Major copyright holders, such as the major record labels and the movie industry, blame the ease of copying for their decreasing profits. Alternative explanations have been put forward, such as poor product content and excessive license charges.

In the United States public interest groups, major corporations and the like, are entering the public education system to teach the curriculum from their perspectives. The lobbying group for the MPAA provide a curriculum entitled What's the Diff? taught by a group of volunteers called Junior Achievement. The Business Software Alliance also has their own curriculum program called Play it Cybersafe, which is distributed to school children through a magazine called The Weekly Reader. The American Librarian Association released their own curriculum for librarians that was distributed in the winter of 2004.

== See also ==
- International copyright agreements

=== Notable copyright abolitionists ===
- David K. Levine
- Stephan Kinsella
- Nina Paley
- Hans-Hermann Hoppe
- Walter Block

=== Notable copyright reformers ===
- Rick Boucher
- Jorge Cortell
- Robin Gross
- Lawrence Lessig
- Eben Moglen
- Richard Stallman
- Siva Vaidhyanathan

=== Notable copyright maximalists ===
- Mary Bono
- Jack Valenti
- Bill Gates
- Charles Gates
- Ryan C. Henry
- Marielle Gallo

== Bibliography ==
- William W. Fisher, Theories of Intellectual Property, in S. Munzer (ed), New Essays in the Legal and Political Theory of Property, Cambridge University Press (2000)
- Peter Drahos, A Philosophy of Intellectual Property, Dartmouth Publishing Co. (1996)
- Alexandra George, Constructing Intellectual Property, Cambridge University Press. (2012).
- Adam D. Moore, Intellectual Property and Information Control, Routledge Pub. 2001, 2004.
- Christian G. Stallberg, Urheberrecht und moralische Rechtfertigung [Copyright and Moral Justification], Duncker & Humblot (2006)
- Christian G. Stallberg, Towards a New Paradigm in Justifying Copyright: An Universalistic
- Oberndörfer, Pascal (2005). Die philosophische Grundlage des Urheberrechts [The Philosophical Basis of Copyright Law]. Nomos Verlagsgesellschaft. ISBN 3-8329-1108-1.
