= Freedom of expression (disambiguation) =

Freedom of speech (FoS), or freedom of expression (FoE), is the right to communicate one's opinions and ideas.

It may also refer to:

- Affirmation of Freedom of Speech and rejection of anti-blasphemy laws
- Defamation of religion, affirmation of Freedom of Speech, and UN
- Freedom from religion
- Freedom of religion
- Freedom of expression in India
- Section Two of the Canadian Charter of Rights and Freedoms#Freedom of expression
- Freedom of Expression (book), a book by Kembrew McLeod about freedom of speech issues

== See also ==
- Blasphemy
- Figure of speech
- Freedom of thought
- Freethought
