= Post open source =

Post-open-source software (POSS) is a term used in discussions of source code published without an explicit software license. The expression gained attention in 2012 after analyst James Governor described some younger developers as treating licensing and governance as unimportant when committing code to GitHub. Richard Fontana later used POSS more narrowly for "seemingly-open-source projects for which explicit licensing appears to be absent".

== History ==
In September 2012, James Governor, co-founder of the analyst firm RedMonk, used the acronym "POSS" in a tweet about younger developers disregarding licensing and governance when committing code to GitHub. Fontana subsequently wrote that he did not believe POSS existed in precisely the sense Governor appeared to intend, although he adopted a narrower definition for convenience. Luis Villa proposed that some publication without a license could be interpreted as an implicit critique of the assumption that sharing requires explicit permission. He nevertheless wrote that confusion, the time required to select a license, and developers being busy or inattentive were probably the primary explanations for the practice.

== See also ==
- License-free software
- Anti-copyright notice
- Copyright reform movement
