= Amusement (disambiguation) =

Amusement is a pleasurable experience.

Amusement may also refer to:

== Facilities ==
- Amusement park, an entertainment facility
  - Amusement center, a small amusement park, often indoors

== Media ==
- Amusement (film), a 2009 horror film
- Amusement (magazine)
- "Amusement" (song), by Hüsker Dü

== Other uses ==
- Amuse Inc., a Japanese entertainment company

== See also ==
- Amuse-bouche
