= Bright (company) =

French 3D digital art company

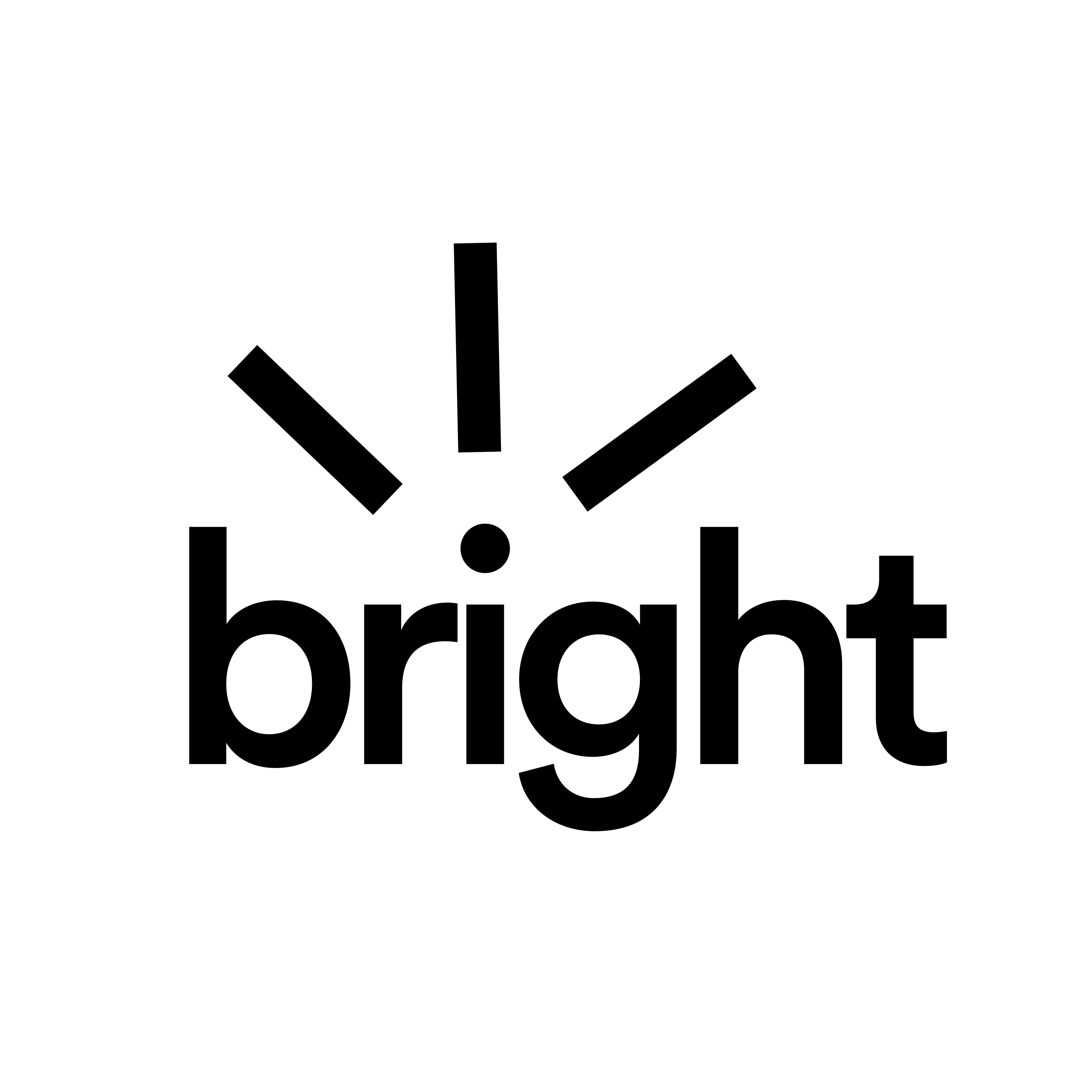
- Company type: Limited liability company
- Industry: 3D Digital art, Interactive design
- Founded: 2015; 11 years ago
- Founders: Abdel Bounane
- Headquarters: Paris, France
- Products: Video Art, Data Art, Interactive art
- Website: brig.ht

Bright is a platform distributing digital art owned by Abdel Bounane.

== Origins ==
Bright first provided video, data and interactive artworks subscriptions for brands, software and apps, connected places and smart cities.

It has been noticed by European newspapers as the first to provide a business model for digital art
