= Kembrew McLeod =

American artist, activist and professor of Communication Studies

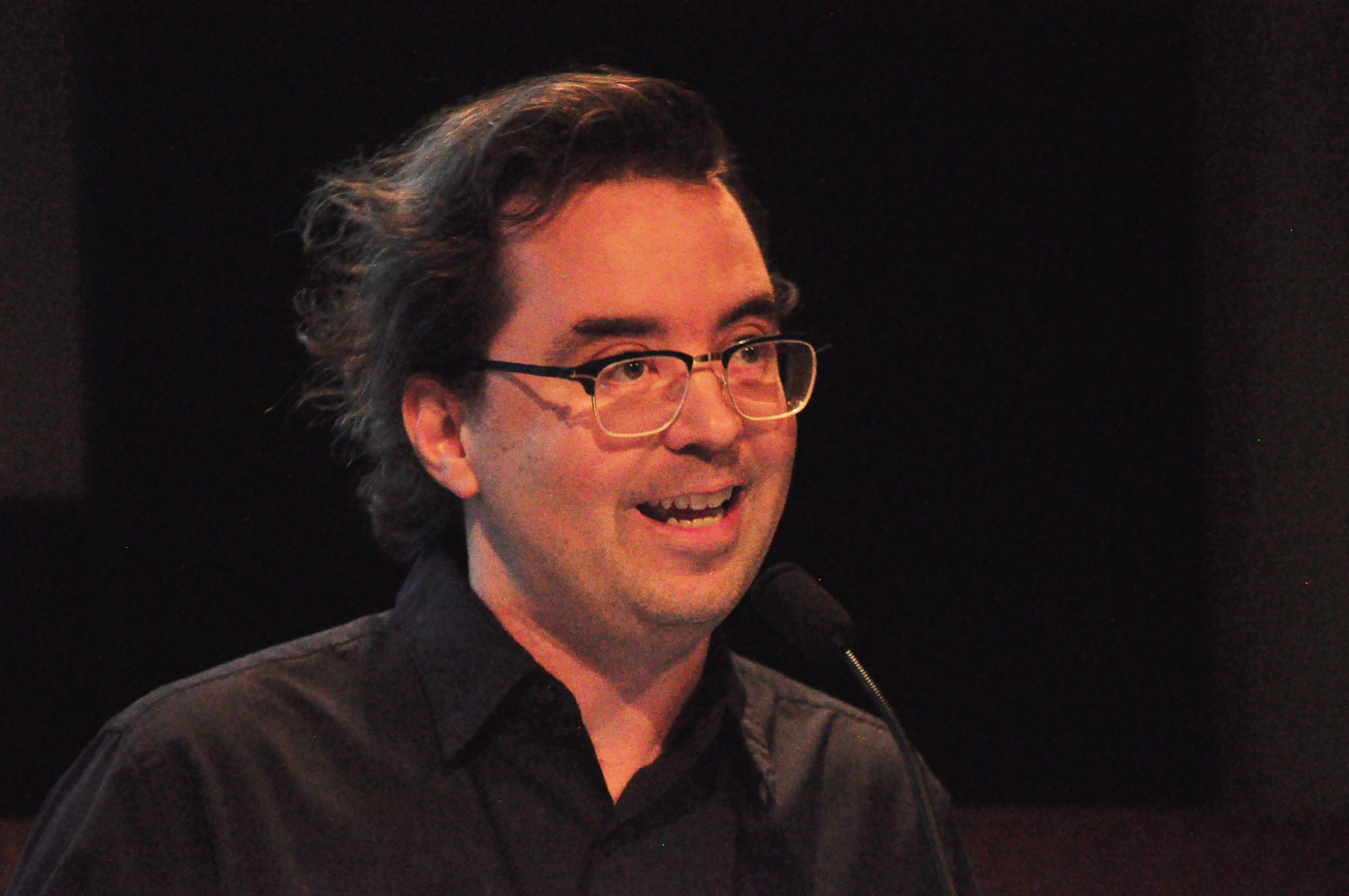
- McLeod in 2014
- Born: United States
- Occupations: Artist, activist, professor

Kembrew McLeod is an author, artist, professor, and media producer whose writing has appeared in the New York Times, Los Angeles Times, Washington Post, Rolling Stone, SPIN, Salon, and Slate. A Professor of Communication Studies at the University of Iowa, where McLeod is department chair, he has received several awards and honors for work that he has created in a variety of mediums.

McLeod received his PhD from University of Massachusetts Amherst, an MA from the University of Virginia, and a BS from James Madison University.

== Books and Documentaries ==
Published in 2018, The Downtown Pop Underground explores the underpinnings of our current culture by looking through a fine lens at the artists, musicians, playwrights and poets that shaped the 60's through the 80's in New York City. It was reviewed favorably by the New York Times and was selected as one of the Best Books on Music by Pitchfork Magazine in 2018.

Freedom of Expression® (Doubleday, 2005) won the American Library Association’s Oboler Book Award for “best scholarship in the area of intellectual freedom,” and he produced a companion documentary of the same name for the Media Education Foundation. McLeod’s three documentaries have been programmed at the SXSW Film Festival, the Toronto International Film Festival, PBS’s Emmy Award-winning Independent Lens documentary series, and other major venues.

McLeod has written music criticism for Rolling Stone, The Village Voice, Spin, and Mojo. He is the coproducer of a 2001 documentary film on the music industry, Money for Nothing: Behind the Business of Pop Music, which he produced for the Media Education Foundation. He is currently working on another documentary on the history of sound collage, digital sampling, and intellectual property law, titled Copyright Criminals: This Is a Sampling Sport.

He participated in the exhibition "Illegal Art: Freedom of Expression in the Corporate Age," which was hosted by the San Francisco Museum of Modern Art's Artist Gallery. In 2005, he helped co-found the Freedom of Expression® Security Consortium, which is dedicated to "Regulating Freedom of Expression in the Marketplace of Ideas". He also is co-editor (with Ted Striphas) of a 2006 special issue of the journal Cultural Studies on "The Politics of Intellectual Properties," which is available for free on the internet.

His book, Freedom of Expression, is available as a free PDF download with a Creative Commons license.

In 2012, one chapter from Freedom of Expression was used as the basis for two essays in the United States Pirate Party's book, No Safe Harbor.

In 2020, during the COVID-19 pandemic, a video of Mcleod dancing to Planet Rock by Afrika Bambaataa went viral on TikTok.

== Media Pranks ==
=== Freedom of Expression Trademark ===
McLeod sought registration of the phrase "Freedom of Expression" as a reflection on the use of intellectual property law to restrict cultural expression in U.S. society. In 2003, McLeod sent AT&T a cease and desist letter in response to an AT&T advertising campaign in college newspapers promoting a new long distance plan which used the phrase "freedom of expression". McLeod claimed that the use by AT&T of his registered trademark could lead some consumers to infer a connection between his publication and AT&T. The New York Times later interviewed McLeod, and reported that his aim was "to object to corporate power over words, speech and even ideas. 'I do want to register my genuine protest that a big company that really doesn't represent freedom of expression is trying to appropriate this phrase,' he said."

Registration no. 2127381 was cancelled in October 2004 when McLeod did not lodge documentary evidence with the United States Patent and Trademark Office to demonstrate that "Freedom of Expression" had been used as a trademark.

=== Protesting Bill Clinton over Sister Souljah controversy ===
On December 10, 2007, McLeod protested a Bill Clinton event in Iowa City, Iowa, dressed as a robot and demanding an apology for remarks made by Clinton in 1992 about controversial hip hop musician Sister Souljah. Before being removed by security and as he was led away, McLeod tossed multi-colored flyers into the air which included the name of a website, mr-ifobca.org, standing for "Mad Robots in Favor of Bill Clinton Apologizing."

== See also ==
- Idea-expression divide
