= Abdel Bounane =

French entrepreneur, chronicler and journalist

- Born: March 16, 1988 (age 38)
- Education: Paris II Panthéon-Assas
- Years active: 2003–present
- Title: CEO, Bright (company)

Abdel Bounane is a French entrepreneur, publisher and editorialist. He is the founder of Amusement, a lifestyle magazine on digital cultures, and the founder of Bright, producing 3D, immersive, playful experiences. Ranked by the media Les Inrocks among the 100 "redefining culture" and WIRED Japan as "changing the way his audience sees the game world", he also writes editorials for CANAL+, French NPR "France Culture", GQ, Le Nouvel Observateur.

== Biography ==
Abdel Bounane founded Amusement, a lifestyle magazine on digital cultures. Its first issue was published in May 2008. Amusement made the press in April 2009 when its 4th issue was the first magazine containing an RFID tag, connecting to the Internet and giving access to digital art and videogames exclusively for the owner of the magazine.

From 2009 to 2010, he wrote the videogames editorials for « Minuit 10 » produced by Laurent Goumarre. From 2010 to 2013, he produced digital editorials on CANAL+ (La Matinale ) with Matena Biraben, for « Un autre midi » with Victor Robert from 2010 to 2011, and for « L’oeil de links » and "L'année du web" from 2012 to 2015.

Since 2015, Abdel Bounane is the founder of Bright, a platform for digital art. Bright is the first platform exhibiting digital art in public spaces and connected cities.

He has been ranked among the 100 people re-inventing culture. He was a speaker for several events.
