= Anti-copyright notice =

Statement encouraging the unrestricted distribution of a work

An anti-copyright notice is a specific statement that is added to a work in order to encourage wide distribution. Such notices are legally required to host such specific media; under the Berne Convention in International copyright agreements, works are protected even if no copyright statement is attached to them. However, "anti-copyright" statements typically do not take the form of either sophisticated public copyright licenses or a simple dedication to the public domain; instead, they usually just encourage wide distribution. Depending on jurisdiction, it is possible to denounce all claims to copyright in a work including moral rights in a written disclaimer.

== Examples ==
An example of an anti-copyright notice is the following:

"Anti-Copyright! Reprint freely, in any manner desired, even without naming the source." Where such notices are attached depends highly on the type of work. They are often found in anarcho-socialist magazines and books.

An example of a copyright waiver is the following:

The author of this work hereby waives all claim of copyright (economic and moral) in this work and immediately places it in the public domain; it may be used, distorted or destroyed in any manner whatsoever without further attribution or notice to the creator.

The Creative Commons CC0 was created for compatibility with law domains (e.g. civil law of continental Europe) which have problems with the concept of dedicating into public domain, as waiver statement with a fallback all-permissive license. The WTFPL, first published in 2000, differs from licenses with public domain designations in that an author can use it even if they do not necessarily have the ability to place their work in the public domain according to their local laws. The Unlicense, published around 2010, has a focus on an anti-copyright message.

Woody Guthrie used an anti-copyright notice on his songs:

This song is Copyrighted in U.S., under Seal of Copyright # 154085, for a period of 28 years, and anybody caught singin it without our permission, will be mighty good friends of ourn, cause we don't give a dern. Publish it. Write it. Sing it. Swing to it. Yodel it. We wrote it, that's all we wanted to do.

Despite this, a number of organisations claim copyright of Guthrie's songs.

Most people would regard "anti-copyright" notices as being equivalent to a dedication of material into the public domain (as in the second example above). Some of these disclaimers, however, are less accurate and need to be interpreted individually as the term anti-copyright has no accepted legal meaning. For example, if just free distribution is encouraged, modification or lack of attribution is still illegal, making the material ineligible for collaborative writing projects like English Wikipedia. In such a case anti-copyright is not a true denial of copyright, but just a modification of the protection it affords copyright holders.

== See also ==
- Copyleft
- Copyright abolition
- Copyright alternatives
- Copyright reform movement
- Criticism of copyright
- Culture vs. Copyright
- Free-culture movement
- Freedom of information
- Information wants to be free
- License-free software
- Post open source
- Public-domain-equivalent license
