= The League of Noble Peers =

Film organization

The League of Noble Peers is an organization credited with producing the Steal This Film documentary series. When releasing Steal This Film (One) the group introduced itself as "a group of friends" that, in 2006, "decided to make a film about filesharing that we would recognise." The Steal This Film series documents the movement against intellectual property and was released via the BitTorrent peer-to-peer protocol.

When releasing Steal This Film (One), The League of Noble Peers stated that:

"There have been a few documentaries by 'old media' crews who don't understand the net and see peer-to-peer organisation as a threat to their livelihoods. They have no reason to represent the filesharing movement positively, and no capacity to represent it lucidly. We wanted to make a film that would explore this huge popular movement in a way that excited us, engaged us, and most importantly, focused on what we know to be the positive and optimistic vision many filesharers and artists (they are often one) have for the future of creativity."

The League of Noble Peers has been described as an "open network of people", "qualified neither by name, age or state", as having "blurry boundaries" and is understood to be "not directly connected" to The Pirate Bay.

In Steal This Film (Two), The League of Noble Peers appears as "Vague Blur" explaining:

"People always ask us, who are The League of Noble Peers? And we tell them: You are, I am, even your bank manager is... insert yourself here, because we all produce information now, we all reproduce information, we all distribute it..."

Jamie King, director of Steal This Film (Two), is known as a member of The League of Noble Peers. Some members of The League of Noble Peers were involved in the organisation of "Oil of the 21st Century - Perspectives on Intellectual Property" conference in Berlin, Germany in November 2007, at which Steal This Film (Two) premiered in a preliminary version.

The League of Noble Peers is working on a third Steal This Film documentary, further exploring the "Oil Of The 21st Century" idea, with Jamie King stating (December 2007) "and we’re headed out to Asia in the new year to start investigating".

== See also ==
- Steal This Film
- The Pirate Bay
- Anti-copyright
- Sci-Hub - network of pirated research papers, "Sci-Hub can instantly provide access to more than two-thirds of all scholarly articles"
