= Pirate Cinema =

Do-it-yourself cinema

Pirate Cinema is a do-it-yourself cinema. Recently Pirate Cinema has been associated with groups in Brazil, Berlin, Copenhagen, Melbourne and Helsinki, where local Pirate Cinema groups are associated with the anti-copyright movement and squatting.

At its simplest Pirate Cinema involved the screening of a movie in front of an audience, for free. Some Pirate Cinema groups perceive their actions within a political context, by deliberately screening copyrighted movies, or movies that document the current copyright debate.

In connection with showing copyrighted movies the Pirate Cinema group in Helsinki had confrontation with the local police.

Pirate Cinema groups are also active in Amsterdam, Stockholm, Paris and London.

== Brazil ==
The first pirate cinema initiative in Brazil was Cine Falcatrua ("Cine Hoax"), an academic film society based on the state of Espírito Santo. Cine Falcatrua started its activities around 2003, downloading movies from P2P networks and screening them in open weekly sessions on the whereabouts of the Federal University of Espírito Santo.

Most of the movies were exhibited by the film society long before they officially got into Brazilian movie theaters. Some of them, like Kill Bill and Fahrenheit 9/11, were screened more than two months before their official release. They were subtitled in Brazilian Portuguese by the very members of Cine Falcatrua.

In June 2004, the university that hosted the project was prosecuted by a couple Brazilian film companies that held the rights to distribute these films in national territory. Nevertheless, the film society did not stop its activities.

In October 2009, the Growing Minds Project started "Cinema Pirata São Paulo", another initiative to encourage free screenings and the popularization of free culture in Brazil. They promote free screenings in many places, theatres, streets, parks, etc., promoting free culture and conscience on the Intellectual Property revolution.

== Copenhagen ==
Pirate Cinema Copenhagen has since 2006 on a regular basis screened movies on different locations in Copenhagen. The group has explained its position in a statement from November 2006. In it the group says:

"The battle of copyright is a battle for control. The film industry is fearing to lose control of which films we want to watch, how we want to watch them and how we produce new film. The technological evolution is giving access to a gigantic supply of film. Video technology is incorporated into cheap cameras and mobile phones. Now that we also can edit our own film on our computers, the film industry is scared - and they should be - of losing their monopoly on creating film culture."

In 2008 the group was renamed Jesper Cinema Copenhagen for a shorter period as a statement relating to the Danish "The Jesper Bay"-campaign.

Pirate Cinema Copenhagen screens mainly copyrighted movies, but makes few exceptions when the movies are copyright-related (such as the Steal This Film and Good Copy Bad Copy documentaries)

== Berlin ==
The group behind Pirate Cinema Berlin states in "Keep Up Your Rights. First Preliminary Program of the Berlin Pirate Cinema" that:

"But above all, the “War on Piracy” is a war against revolution: against the French Revolution that has generalized individual rights and against the Digital Revolution that has generalized the individual exchange of data."

Pirate Cinema Berlin regularly screens copyrighted and un-copyrighted movies.

Members of Pirate Cinema Berlin were interviewed, asked "How did it all start?" they answered: "(Sebastian Lütgert) Conventional cinema is fucked up and useless... (Jan Gerber) But we started off because one of the films we had hadn’t been distributed and we wanted to have it screened . Our strong opinions about copyright and restrictions on distributing digital data always surfaced in Pirate Cinema events, with their motto: »Free admission, cheap drinks, and bring a blank CD.«"

Segments of an interview with Sebastian Lütgert are featured in Steal This Film (Two), reflecting on copyright, internet and culture.

The "archive" of Pirate Cinema Berlin is said to be growing steadily. Content is mostly obtained via different peer-to-peer file-sharing networks. In late 2008, it contains over 3 TB of compressed, tagged, sorted and searchable video material.

== Melbourne ==
In Melbourne a pirate cinema group has been running successfully (although sporadically) since early 2010. Amongst other things they aim provide free entertainment, protest against copyright and censorship laws, and make use of abandoned & disused spaces screening films under freeway bridges, in abandoned buildings & squats, etc... They mostly screen independent or less known films that would not be shown at a mainstream cinema.

== Helsinki ==
In Helsinki on organiser of the local Pirate Cinema has been arrested by police in connection with the screening of copyrighted movies. The organisers said that their aim is to show the discrepancy between laws and how people really act.

Antti Kotilainen, executive director of the Copyright Information and Anti-piracy Centre (CIAPC), stated "They say that they are anarchists, fighting against big movie moguls. Then the only recreation that they have is to show movies produced by the companies that they despise so much."

Professor Jukka Kemppinen, an expert on copyright legislation, states that Pirate Cinema is a deliberate provocation, but that, despite it being illegal, there is no point in making a big issue out of it. Kemppinen states "It is no more illegal than showing a legally rented DVD to residents of an apartment building after an afternoon of volunteer work."

== See also ==
- The Pirate Bay
- Good Copy Bad Copy
- Steal This Film
- Copyright
- Anti-copyright
