= Copyright alternatives =

Compensation systems for digital copying

Various copyright alternatives in an alternative compensation systems (ACS) have been proposed as ways to allow the widespread reproduction of digital copyrighted works while still paying the authors and copyright owners of those works. This article only discusses those proposals that involve some form of government intervention. Other models, such as the street performer protocol or voluntary collective licenses, could arguably be called "alternative compensation systems," although they are very different and generally less effective at solving the free rider problem.

The impetus for these proposals has come from the widespread use of peer-to-peer file-sharing networks. A few authors argue that an ACS is simply the only practical response to the situation. But most ACS advocates go further, holding that P2P file sharing is in fact greatly beneficial and that tax or levy-funded systems are actually more desirable tools for paying artists than sales coupled with digital rights management copy prevention technologies.

== Artistic freedom voucher ==
The artistic freedom voucher (AFV) proposal argues that the current copyright system providing a state enforced monopoly leads to "enormous inefficiencies and creates substantial enforcement problems". Under the AFV proposed system, individuals would be allowed to contribute a refundable tax credit of approximately $100 to a "creative worker", this contribution would act as a voucher that can only be used to support artistic or creative work.

Recipients of the AFV contribution would in turn be required to register with the government in similar fashion to that of religious or charitable institutions do so for tax-exempt status. The sole purpose of the registration would be to prevent fraud and would have no evaluation of the quality or work being produced. Alongside registration, artists would also now be ineligible for copyright protection for a set period of time (5 years for example) as the work is contributed to the public domain and allowed to be freely reproduced. The AFV would not affect creative workers ability to receive funds via live performances.

Proponents claim that this system could create up to $20 billion annually to pay artists, which is far greater than what currently flows to them through copyrighted material. At $100 per adult voucher, over 500,000 writers, musicians, singers, actors, or other creative workers could be paid some $40,000 a year. Baker also states that it is realistic to assume that the savings from the reduced expenditures on the copyrighted work would vastly exceed the cost of the AFV. The majority of these savings would come from individuals deciding to use AFV supported work in place of copyrighted work as well as lower advertising costs because the AFV material would be public domain. Copyright enforcement demand would also decrease as AFV material increased. The assumptions made are that in the low end direct costs to the public of copyrighted material would be reduced around 20 percent while in the high end all the way up to 60 percent. Over time it is also likely that the savings would increase due to the lesser costs of the system and brighter prospects.

In a 2010 article critical of the AFV proposal for the Mises Institute, J. Mark Stanley writes: "Like school vouchers, the flat tax, and other pretenders, the AFV assumes the necessity of state intervention, and tries to bend liberty around such strictures. Freedom isn't so forgiving to such manipulation."

=== Donation-based record labels ===
While the systematic restructuring of copyright laws proposed by AFV is far from being put into practice, the concept of paying artists with donations has been tested, with some success. In 2006, musician Jeff Rosenstock founded Quote Unquote Records, which advertised itself as the first donation-based record label. Artists on this label make their music available to download for free, and invite listeners to make a small donation if they want to. Between donations and ticket sales for live shows, Quote Unquote Records has been successfully recording music and expanding the number of bands on their label for the past twelve years.

== Architectural details ==
=== Where does the money come from ===
Proposals have included targeted levies on internet connections, blank CDs, digital media players, etc. (many of these goods are levied various countries' existing private copying schemes); income taxation; or optional payments by users.

In terms of economic theory, consumer "opt in" regimes are very different from universal ones, but depending on how the scheme was administered, the differences might not be so large. For example, if the default option for ISP subscribers was to pay an ACS surcharge, which could be avoided by filing a signed commitment not to make unauthorised downloads from P2P networks, the effects might be quite similar. This scheme however is unsuitable for business owners who maintain free internet connections as incentive for customers. It would then be the responsibility of the business owner to monitor his or her customer's internet use.

=== Where does it go ===
Various proposals have been made to base the distribution of royalties on measures of consumer downloading, usage or voting.

The computer security issues to be addressed in collecting this data are considerable. The privacy and verifiability obstacles are very similar to those encountered in Internet voting; they may be soluble, but only with hardware assistance not currently available on ordinary PCs. The most practical way to deploy an ACS in the short term would be to collect statistical samples from a much smaller population.

The actual distribution of royalties would likely be carried out by a copyright collecting society.

== Advantages and disadvantages ==
Alternative compensation systems have two very significant advantages over digital copyright. They do not impose artificial scarcity on copyright works: everyone can download as many songs, ebooks and films as they want (in economic terns, ACS eliminate the deadweight loss of copyright monopolies). They also avoid the very high technological and social costs of digital copyright enforcement.

The two greatest drawbacks of ACSes are the excess burden of the taxation that is collected, and the need to decide what tax/levy rates to use for the system (although methods such as contingent valuation may help a little with that question).

== Alternative compensation systems in practice ==
Canada's private copying levy had the unforeseen result of temporarily creating an ACS for some kinds of P2P downloading. In BMG v. Doe, a dictum suggested that this should also apply to uploading; but the dictum was criticised on appeal.

In France, the December 2005 DADVSI amendments that were passed by the Senate would have created an ACS called a "global license". These amendments were removed before the bill finally became law.

In 2009, the German Social Democratic Party added a proposal for an ACS variant called a "cultural flat-rate" to its party platform.

== See also ==
- Anti-copyright notice
- Copyright abolition
- Criticism of copyright
- Free-culture movement
- Free software license
- Free content license
- Freedom of information
- Information wants to be free
- Steal This Film
- Zeitgeist (film series)#Zeitgeist: Addendum
- Zeitgeist (film series)#Zeitgeist: Moving Forward
- Television licensing in the United Kingdom, in effect an annual flat-tax in the United Kingdom, which funds the BBC

== Bibliography ==
- Baker, D. The Artistic Freedom Voucher: Internet Age Alternative to Copyrights 2003.
- Copley, D. "Put a Dime in the Heavenly Jukebox", Multimedia & Entertainment Law Online News 7 (701), 2001.
- Eckersley, P. Virtual Markets for Virtual Goods: The Mirror Image of Digital Copyright? 18 Harvard Journal of Law and Technology 85, 2004.
- Fisher, W.W. Promises to Keep: Technology, Law and the Future of Entertainment, Stanford Univ. Press 2004.
- Gervais, D. "The Price of Social Norms: Towards a Liability Regime for File Sharing", 12 Journal of Intellectual Property Law 39, 2004.
- Liebowitz, S. Alternative Copyright Systems: The Problems with a Compulsory License, Presented at SERCIAC 2003.
- Love, J. Artists Want to Be Paid: The Blur/Banff Proposal 2002
- Netanel, N.W. Impose a Noncommercial Use Levy to Allow Free Peer-to-peer File Sharing 17 Harvard Journal of Law and Technology 1, 2003.
- Stallman, R.M. The Right Way to Tax D.A.T, Wired, 1992.
