= Copyright abolition =

Movement advocating to abolish copyright

Copyright abolition is a movement to abolish copyright and all subsequent laws made in its support. The notion of anti-copyright combines a group of ideas and ideologies that advocate changing copyright law. It often focuses on the philosophical, economic, or social implication of copyright, arguing that its benefits to society are questionable and that it may hinder creativity while concentrating advantages among certain stakeholders. Some groups question the justification of copyright on economic and cultural grounds. Members of this movement are in favor of either a significant overhaul or a repeal of copyright law.

Michele Boldrin and David K. Levine, economists at Washington University in St. Louis, have suggested that copyrights and patents are a net loss for the economy because of the way they reduce competition in the free market. They refer to copyrights and patents as intellectual monopolies, akin to industrial monopolies, and they advocate phasing out and eventually abolishing them.

One common argument in defense of copyright is the view that giving developers a temporary monopoly over their work encourages further development and creativity, giving the developer a source of income, thus encouraging them to continue.

On the other hand, there are arguments regarding copyright and its compatibility with property rights from libertarian perspective. For instance the premise that Stephan Kinsella establishes, that copyright shouldn't exist since it doesn't represent economic rivalry of scarce goods like physical resources, which justify the existence of property rights, because ideas are not scarce nor present rivalry. This argument applies to other forms of intellectual property rights, like patents.

Copyright is also massively rejected by those partaking in online piracy and peer-to-peer sharing networks, who distribute copyrighted materials into public access. In the context of the Internet, Web 2.0, and other newer technologies, it has been argued that copyright law needs to be adapted to modern information technology.

Usually copyright is secured under the Berne Convention, established by Victor Hugo and first adopted in 1886. Almost every country in the world has copyright laws and private information ownership has not been repealed anywhere officially. Numerous international agreements on copyright have been concluded since then, but copyright law still varies from country to country.

== See also ==
- Business ethics § Intellectual property
- Copyright alternatives
- Copyright misuse
- Copyfraud
- Corporatocracy
- Cory Doctorow
- Creative Commons
- Criticism of copyright
- Culture vs. Copyright
- Cyber-utopianism
- Electronic Frontier Foundation (EFF)
- Enshittification
- Fair use
- File sharing
- Free-culture movement
- Freedom of information
- Free Software Foundation (FSF)
- Information wants to be free
- Intellectual property § Criticisms
- Patent troll
- Permissive software licence
- Piratbyrån
  - Kopimi
- Pirate Party
- Public domain
- Richard Stallman
- Steal This Film
