= Permission culture =

Term often employed by Lawrence Lessig and other copyright activists

Permission culture is a term often employed by Lawrence Lessig and other copyright activists such as Luis Villa and Nina Paley to describe a society in which copyright restrictions are pervasive and enforced to the extent that any and all uses of copyrighted works need to be explicitly leased. This has both economic and social implications: in such a society, copyright holders could require payment for each use of a work and, perhaps more importantly, permission to make any sort of derivative work.

Lawrence Lessig describes permission culture in contrast with free culture. While permission culture describes a society in which previous creators or those with power must grant people permission to use material, free culture ensures that anyone is able to create without restrictions from the past. An example Lessig cites in his book, Free Culture, is photography. In this example, if the legal environment surrounding the early stages of photography had been stricter with what constituted ownership and leaned more towards permission culture, photography would have developed in a drastically different manner and would be limited.

An implication of permission culture is that creators are blocked by systemic procedures and this discourages innovation. Requiring permission in this sense means that creators will have to prove their usage of material is fair, even where legally unnecessary, which is a process that some would decide not to continue.

This term is often contrasted with remix culture.

== See also ==
- Chilling effect (law)
- Orphan works
- Copyleft
- Free content
- Good Copy Bad Copy
