= Association des Audionautes =

French lobby group

The Association des Audionautes (English: Association of Audionauts) is a French lobby group founded by Aziz Ridouan, Quentin Renaudo and Jean-Baptiste Soufron in October 2004 that supports Internet users sharing files, including copyrighted material, over peer-to-peer networks.

It provides legal information to Internet users accused of copyright infringement.

It lobbies for the establishment of a "legal licence" for peer-to-peer users, whereby they would be immune to prosecution for copyright infringement as long as their trading is noncommercial and they pay a flat fee, which would be distributed to artists and producers as are other similar fees (on blank media, or for radio and TV uses).
