= Steal This Film =

2006 film series on piracy culture

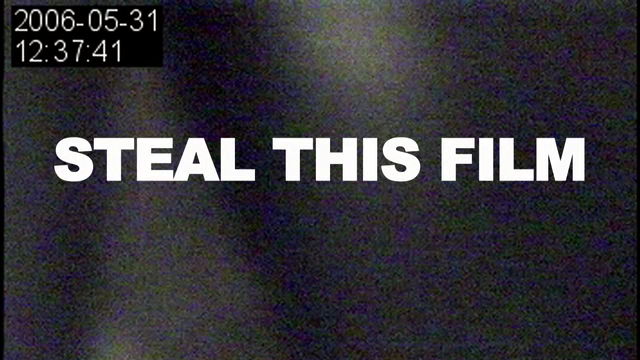
- Produced by: The League of Noble Peers
- Starring: Members of The Pirate Bay and Piratbyrån
- Distributed by: Independent; BitTorrent only
- Release date: 21 August 2006
- Running time: 32 minutes (original); 52 minutes (trial edition)
- Countries: UK and Germany
- Languages: English, with some subtitled Swedish
- Budget: $3,000

Steal This Film 2
- Directed by: Jamie King
- Produced by: The League of Noble Peers
- Cinematography: Luca Lucarini
- Edited by: Luca Lucarini
- Distributed by: Independent; BitTorrent only
- Release date: 28 December 2007
- Running time: 44 minutes
- Countries: United Kingdom, Germany
- Language: English

Steal This Film is a film series documenting the movement against intellectual property directed by Jamie King, produced by The League of Noble Peers and released via the BitTorrent peer-to-peer protocol.

Two parts, and one special The Pirate Bay trial edition of the first part, have been released so far, and The League of Noble Peers is working on "Steal this Film – The Movie" and a new project entitled "The Oil of the 21st Century".

== Part one ==
Part One, shot in Sweden and released in August 2006, combines accounts from prominent players in the Swedish piracy culture (The Pirate Bay, Piratbyrån, and the Pirate Party) with found material, propaganda-like slogans and Vox Pops.

It includes interviews with The Pirate Bay members Fredrik Neij (tiamo), Gottfrid Svartholm (anakata) and Peter Sunde (brokep) that were later re-used by agreement in the documentary film Good Copy Bad Copy, as well as with Piratbyrån members Rasmus Fleischer (rsms), Johan (krignell) and Sara Andersson (fraux).

The film is notable for its critical analysis of an alleged regulatory capture attempt performed by the Hollywood film lobby to leverage economic sanctions by the United States government on Sweden through the WTO. Evidence is presented of pressure applied through Swedish courts on Swedish police to conducting a search and seizure against The Pirate Bay to disrupt its BitTorrent tracker service, in contravention of Swedish law.

The Guardian's James Flint called Part One "at heart a traditionally structured 'talking heads' documentary" with "amusing stylings" from film-makers who "practice what they preach." It also screened at the British Film Institute and numerous independent international events, and was a talking point in 2007's British Documentary Film Festival. In January 2008 it was featured on BBC Radio 4's Today, in a discussion piece which explored the implications of P2P for traditional media.

Material found in Steal This Film includes the music of Can, tracks "Thief" and "She Brings the Rain"; clips from other documentary interviews with industry and governmental officials; several industry anti-piracy promotionals; logos from several major Hollywood studios, and sequences from The Day After Tomorrow, The Matrix, Zabriskie Point, and They Live. The use of these short clips is believed to constitute fair use.

== Part two ==
Steal This Film featured interviews with cultural economy theorists such as Yochai Benkler. Here, Benkler discusses the growth of user autonomy, and the transition towards broader participation in creating culture

Steal This Film (Part 2) (sometimes subtitled 'The Dissolving Fortress') was produced during 2007. It premiered (in a preliminary version) at a conference entitled "The Oil of the 21st Century – Perspectives on Intellectual Property" in Berlin, Germany, November 2007.

Thematically, Part 2 "examines the technological and enforcement end of the copyright wars, and on the way that using the internet makes you a copier, and how copying puts you in legal jeopardy." It discusses Mark Getty's assertion that 'intellectual property is the oil of the 21st century'. Part 2 draws parallels between the impact of the printing press and the internet in terms of making information accessible beyond a privileged group or "controllers". The argument is made that the decentralised nature of the internet makes the enforcement of conventional copyright impossible. Adding to this the internet turns consumers into producers, by way of user generated content, leading to the sharing, mashup and creation of content not motivated by financial gains. This has fundamental implications for market-based media companies. The documentary asks "How will society change" and states "This is the Future – And it has nothing to do with your bank balance".

Boing Boing's Cory Doctorow called it 'an amazing, funny, enraging and inspiring documentary series', and Part II "even better than part I."

=== Interviewees (in order of appearance) ===
- Yochai Benkler, professor at Yale Law School
- Rick Prelinger, founder of the Prelinger Archive
- Erik Dubbelboer, co-founder of Mininova
- Aaron Swartz, co-founder of Reddit
- Fred von Lohmann, counsel at Google
- Brewster Kahle, founder of the Internet Archive
- Howard Rheingold, critic and author of Smart Mobs
- Dan Glickman, former chairman of the Motion Picture Association of America
- Lawrence Liang, co-founder of the Alternative Law Forum
- Sebastien Lütgert, member of Pirate Cinema
- Elizabeth Eisenstein, historian
- Siva Vaidhyanathan, professor of Media Studies and law at the University of Virginia
- Robert Darnton, cultural historian
- Felix Stadler, media theorist
- Adam Burns, director at free2air.org
- Eben Moglen, founder of the Software Freedom Law Center
- Seth Schoen, senior staff technologist for the Electronic Frontier Foundation
- Peter Sunde, co-founder and ex-spokesperson of The Pirate Bay
- Robert Luxemburg, artist
- Craig Baldwin, experimental filmmaker
- The League of Noble Peers (represented by a "Vague Blur")
- S.K.I.T.Z Beatz, composer and record producer
- Wiley, rapper
- Raph Levien, free software developer and Google employee

== Trial Edition ==
A Trial Edition (also known as '2.5' or 'Spectrial' edition) was released to coincide with the trial in 2009 of The Pirate Bay. This version includes material from Steal This Film I and II combined with new interviews shot with Peter Sunde and others during 2008, some historical background about the Pirate Bay and Dutch printers (who were also considered pirates) as well as interview clips about the legal conflict itself. Steal This Film 'Spectrial Edition' is widely available online and it is thought to be this version that is now available to television stations and others.

The new edition of Steal This Film was part of the Official Selection and in competition at the 2009 Roma Fiction Festival (Factual strand). The jury awarded a Special Mention for its "unconventional style and provocative look at the media revolution taking place in the world."

== Festivals, cinema and other screenings ==
Steal This Film was selected for the Sheffield International Documentary Film Festival 2008, South By Southwest festival 2008 in Austin, Texas, and the Singapore International Film Festival 2008. Other festivals at which it was shown included Tampere Film Festival, 2008, Salt Spring Film Festival 2007, Rhythm of the Line Festival 2007 and Kerala International Film Festival, India. Steal This Film was nominated for the Ars Electronica 2008 Digital Communities prize and was a semi-finalist in online video-streaming site Babelgum's 2008 competition. Amongst others it has been shown on History Channel Spain, Canal + Poland, Noga Israel, TV4 Sweden and Dublin Community TV, Ireland.

The film is taught in Universities on media courses worldwide, including New York University's Media Culture & Communication course.

=== Online distribution ===
The filmmakers reported that about 4.86 million people had seen Steal This Film, based on torrent-download figures from The Pirate Bay and their own server logs.

Part One was released through an arrangement with The Pirate Bay; the filesharing site marketed Steal This Film in place of its own pirate ship logo. This produced millions of downloads for the film and catapulted it to wide recognition on the Internet after it hit Digg, Slashdot, Reddit and other online centres of attention.

Steal This Film (Part 2) was distributed in a similar manner, but with more trackers and indexes involved, including Isohunt and Mininova. Estimates of the total current downloads of the film hover at around the 6 million mark via bittorrent alone. Since the creators have not attempted to restrict copying, the film is also available on YouTube, Google Video and many other web-based video services.

A cam version leaked soon after the premiere of Steal This Film (Part 2) in Berlin. Part 2 had its theatrical (rather than viewed online) premiere at the openly organised Who Makes And Owns Your Work artistic seminar in Stockholm 2007. Despite the principles of the seminar itself (organised via public wiki in a year-long process), the involvement of Piratbyran roused the funders of the seminar, the Swedish Arts Grants Committee, to prohibit Piratbyran's logo on the seminar marketing materials alongside its own. The seminar initiators' solution was to add a black sticker dot over the logo, which was easily peeled off. Another condition given by the committee was that a moderator or an anti-piracy spokesperson be present to balance the debate.

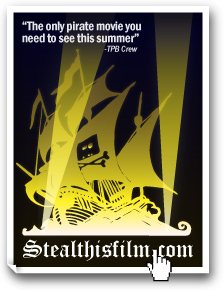
Film poster mockup used the logo for The Pirate Bay

The documentary was officially released for peer-to-peer filesharing using peer-to-peer networks on 28 December 2007 and, according to the filmmakers, downloaded 150,000 times in the first three days of distribution. Pirate Bay encouraged the downloading of Steal This Film Two, announcing its release on its blog. Steal This Film Part 2 was also screened by the Pirate Cinema Copenhagen in January 2008. The documentary can also be downloaded on the official Steal This Film website.

=== Language ===
Both Part One and Part Two are in English, mostly, with the former having some Swedish dialogue subtitled in English. Due to great interest in the documentary by volunteer translators, Part Two has subtitles in Czech, Croatian, Danish, Dutch, French, Finnish, German, Greek, Hungarian, Italian, Polish, Portuguese, Russian, Spanish, Turkish and Ukrainian.

== Financing ==
As well as funding from BRITDOC, the Steal This Film producers continues to use a loose version of the Street Performer Protocol, collecting voluntary donations via a PayPal account, from the website. For future financing, director Jamie King (producer) has written that he and the League of Noble Peers propose, a "post IP compensation system" which "allows viewers and listeners to make voluntary payments right from the client in which they play media."

=== Donations ===
The League of Noble Peers asked for donations and more than US$30,000 ($45,021 in 2025) had been received as of 5 July 2009. The filmmakers report that roughly one in a thousand viewers are donating, mostly USD $15–40.

== Credits ==
Steal This Film One and Two are credited as 'conceived, directed, and produced' by The League of Noble Peers. Where Part One contains no personal attribution, Part Two has full credits.

== See also ==
- Steal This Book
- Steal this Album!
- Anti-copyright
- Copyright
- Copyleft
- Copyright abolition
- Criticism of copyright
- Freedom of information
- Free-culture movement
- Free video
- Gift economy
- Good Copy Bad Copy
- Information wants to be free
- Mashup
- The Internet's Own Boy
- Philosophy of copyright
- May 2006 police raid of The Pirate Bay
- The Pirate Bay Away From Keyboard
- Piracy is theft
- Pirate Cinema
- Pirate Party
- Pirate Party Germany
- Pirate Party UK
- Remix culture
- RiP!: A Remix Manifesto
- Warez
- Sci-Hub - network of pirated research papers, "Sci-Hub can instantly provide access to more than two-thirds of all scholarly articles"
