= Criticism of copyright =

Dissenting views of copyright law

The symbol of Kopimi, an anti-copyright initiative developed by the Piratbyrån, a Swedish organisation actively opposing modern copyright law and practices, and the previous operators of BitTorrent tracker The Pirate Bay, before it was spun off as an independent organisation

There are numerous perspectives that question or challenge aspects of current copyright laws or the concept of copyright itself. Critics often discuss philosophical, economical, or social rationales of such laws and the laws' implementations, the benefits of which they claim do not justify the policy's costs to society. They advocate for changing the current system, though different groups have different ideas of what that change should be. Some call for remission of the policies to a previous state—copyright once covered few categories of things and had shorter term limits—or they may seek to expand concepts like fair use that allow permissionless copying. Others seek the abolition of copyright itself.

Opposition to copyright is often a portion of platforms advocating for broader social reform. For example, Lawrence Lessig, a free-culture movement speaker, advocates for loosening copyright law as a means of making sharing information easier or addressing the orphan works issue and the Swedish Pirate Party has advocated for limiting copyright to five year terms.

== Economic arguments ==
An anti-copyright symbol

=== Non-scarcity ===
Copyright critics claim that unlike physical property, works restricted by copyright are not scarce because copies can be made without destroying the original or depriving anyone else of ownership. As a policy choice, many states have established copyright systems, which create scarcity by punishing people who make unauthorized copies. Accordingly, critics frequently observe that copyright infringement is not the same as theft, because theft deprives someone of access to what has been taken.

=== Uncertain economical impact ===
It is uncommon for copyright laws to be assessed based on empirical studies of their impacts. Critics argue that it is unclear whether copyright laws are economically beneficial for most authors.

== Information technology related concerns ==
Co-founder of Piratbyrån Rasmus Fleischer has argued that copyright law simply seems unable to cope with the Internet, and hence is obsolete. He argues that the Internet, and particularly Web 2.0, have brought about the uncertain status of the very idea of "stealing" itself, and that instead business models need to adapt to the reality of the Darknet. He argues that in an attempt to rein in Web 2.0, copyright law in the 21st century is increasingly concerned with criminalising entire technologies, leading to recent attacks on different kinds of search engines, solely because they provide links to files which may be copyrighted. Fleischer points out that Google, while still largely uncontested, operates in a gray zone of copyright (e.g. the business model of Google Books is to display millions of pages of copyrighted and uncopyrighted books as part of a business plan drawing its revenue from advertising). In contrast, others have pointed out that Google Books blocks out large sections of those same books, and they say that does not harm the legitimate interests of rightsholders.

Others have suggested that copyright law must be reformed as a matter of national security, proposing that Western countries make legal carveouts for text and data mining so as to remain ahead in the AI arms race.

== Cultural arguments ==
First "Minute Meme" video of QuestionCopyright.org

=== Freedom of knowledge ===
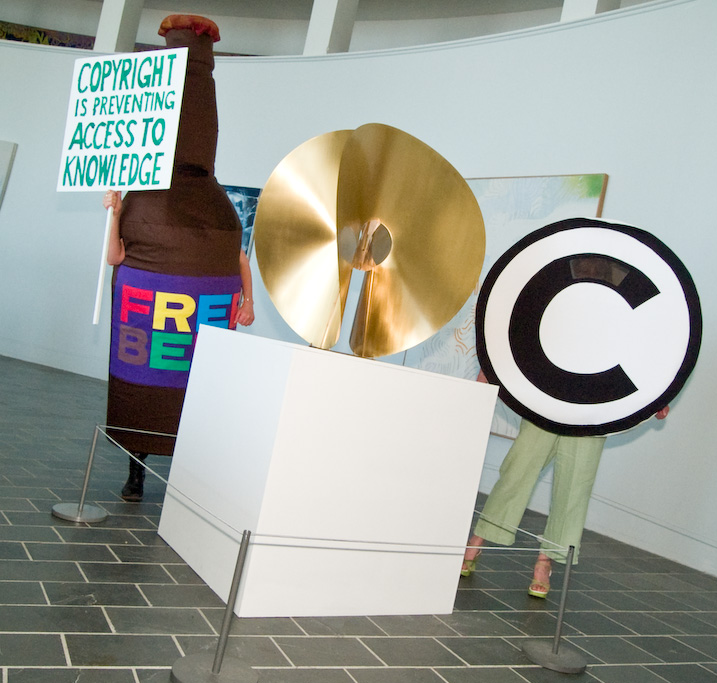
"Free Beer" demonstrator supporting the "freedom of knowledge" idea: "Copyright is preventing access to knowledge" (2007).

Groups such as Hipatia advance anti-copyright arguments in the name of "freedom of knowledge" and argue that knowledge should be "shared in solidarity". Such groups may perceive "freedom of knowledge" as a right, and/or as fundamental in realising the right to education, which is an internationally recognised human right, as well as the right to a free culture and the right to free communication. They argue that current copyright law hinders the realisation of these rights in today's knowledge societies relying on new technological means of communication and see copyright law as preventing or slowing human progress.

=== Authorship and creativity ===
Lawrence Liang, founder of the Alternative Law Forum, argues that current copyright is based on a too narrow definition of "author", which is assumed to be clear and undisputed. Liang observes that the concept of "the author" is assumed to make universal sense across cultures and across time. Instead, Liang argues that the notion of the author as a unique and transcendent being, possessing originality of spirit, was constructed in Europe after the Industrial Revolution, to distinguish the personality of the author from the expanding realm of mass-produced goods. Hence works created by "authors" were deemed original, and merges with the doctrine of property prevalent at the time.

Liang argues that the concept of "author" is tied to the notion of copyright and emerged to define a new social relationship—the way society perceives the ownership of knowledge. The concept of "author" thus naturalised a particular process of knowledge production where the emphasis on individual contribution and individual ownership takes precedence over the concept of "community knowledge". Relying on the concept of the author, copyright is based on the assumption that without an intellectual property rights regime, authors would have no incentive to further create, and that artists cannot produce new works without an economic incentive. Liang challenges this logic, arguing that "many authors who have little hope of ever finding a market for their publications, and whose copyright is, as a result, virtually worthless, have in the past, and even in the present, continued to write." Liang points out that people produce works purely for personal satisfaction, or even for respect and recognition from peers. Liang argues that the 19th Century saw the prolific authorship of literary works in the absence of meaningful copyright that benefited the author. In fact, Liang argues, copyright protection usually benefited the publisher, and rarely the author.

=== Preservation of cultural works ===
The Center for the Study of Public Domain has raised concerns on how the protracted copyright terms in the United States have caused historical films and other cultural works to be destroyed due to disintegration before they can be digitized. The center has described the copyright terms as "absurdly long" which hold little economic benefit to rights holders and prevents efforts to preserve historical artefacts. Director Jennifer Jenkins has said that by the time artefacts enter the public domain in the United States after 95 years, many culturally significant works such as old films and sound recordings have already been lost as a consequence of the long copyright terms.

== Ethical issues ==
The institution of copyright raises several ethical issues. Critics tend to believe these issues should be resolved in ways that do not favor copyright.

=== Censorship ===
Critics of copyright argue that copyright has been abused to suppress free speech, as well as business competition, academic research and artistic expression. As a consequence, copyright legislation such as the DMCA has enabled copyright owners to "censor academic discussions and online criticism".

=== Philosophical arguments ===
Selmer Bringsjord argues that all forms of copying are morally permissible (without commercial use), because some forms of copying are permissible and there is not a logical distinction between various forms of copying.

Edwin Hettinger argues that natural rights arguments for intellectual property are weak and the philosophical tradition justifying property can not guide us in thinking about intellectual property. Shelly Warwick believes that copyright law as currently constituted does not appear to have a consistent ethical basis.

== Organisations and scholars ==
=== Groups advocating the abolition of copyright ===
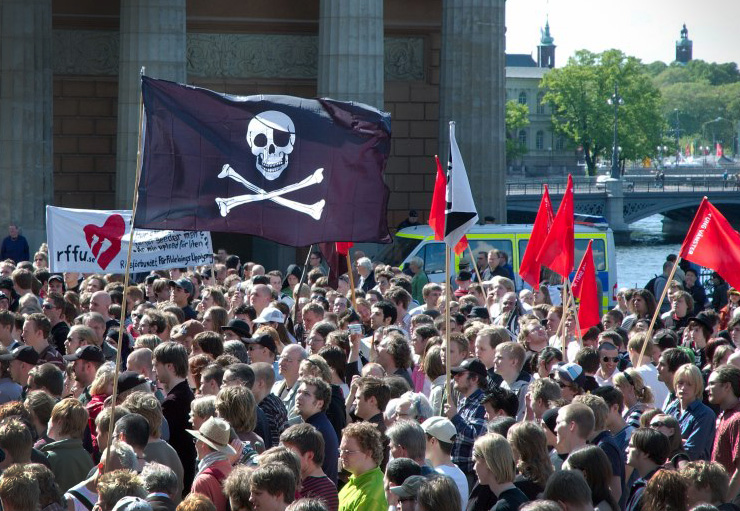
Demonstration in Sweden in support of file sharing, 2006

Pirate Cinema and groups like The League of Noble Peers advocate for the abolition of copyright. A number of anti-copyright groups have emerged in the argument over peer-to-peer file sharing, digital freedom, and freedom of information; these include the Association des Audionautes and the Kopimism Church of New Zealand.

In 2003, Eben Moglen, a professor of Law at Columbia University, published The dotCommunist Manifesto, which re-interpreted the Communist Manifesto by Karl Marx in the light of the development of computer technology and the internet; much of the re-interpreted content discussed copyright law and privilege in Marxist terms.

Recent developments related to BitTorrent and peer-to-peer file sharing have been termed by media commentators as "copyright wars", with The Pirate Bay being referred to as "the most visible member of a burgeoning international anti-copyright—or pro-piracy—movement". One well-publicised instance of electronic civil disobedience in the form of large scale intentional copyright infringement occurred on February 24, 2004, in an event called Grey Tuesday. Activists intentionally violated EMI's copyright of The White Album by distributing MP3 files of a mashup album called The Grey Album, in an attempt to draw public attention to copyright reform issues and anti-copyright ideals. Reportedly over 400 sites participated including 170 that hosted the album with some protesters stating that The Grey Album illustrates a need for revisions in copyright law to allow sampling under fair use of copyrighted material, or proposing a system of fair compensation to allow for sampling.

=== Groups advocating changes to copyright law ===
French group Association des Audionautes is not anti-copyright per se, but proposes a reformed system for copyright enforcement and compensation. Aziz Ridouan, co-founder of the group, proposes for France to legalise peer-to-peer file sharing and to compensate artists through a surcharge on Internet service provider fees (i.e. an alternative compensation system). Wired magazine reported that major music companies have equated Ridouan's proposal with legitimising piracy. In January 2008, seven Swedish members of parliament from the Moderate Party (part of the governing coalition), authored a piece in a Swedish tabloid calling for the complete decriminalisation of file sharing; they wrote that "Decriminalising all non-commercial file sharing and forcing the market to adapt is not just the best solution. It's the only solution, unless we want an ever more extensive control of what citizens do on the Internet."

In June 2015, a WIPO article, "Remix culture and Amateur Creativity: A Copyright Dilemma", acknowledged the "age of remixing" and the need for a copyright reform while referring to recent law interpretations in Lenz v. Universal Music Corp. and Canada's Copyright Modernization Act.

=== Groups advocating using existing copyright law ===
Groups that argue for using existing copyright legal framework with special licences to achieve their goals, include the copyleft movement and Creative Commons. Creative Commons is not anti-copyright per se, but argues for use of more flexible and open copyright licences within existing copyright law. Creative Commons takes the position that there is an unmet demand for flexibility that allows the copyright owner to release work with only "some rights reserved" or even "no rights reserved". According to Creative Commons many people do not regard default copyright as helping them in gaining the exposure and widespread distribution they want. Creative Commons argue that their licences allow entrepreneurs and artists to employ innovative business models rather than all-out copyright to secure a return on their creative investment.

=== Scholars and commentators ===
Scholars and commentators in this field include Lawrence Liang, Jorge Cortell, Rasmus Fleischer, Stephan Kinsella, Michele Boldrin, David K. Levine and Siva Vaidhyanathan.

Traditional anarchists, such as Leo Tolstoy, expressed their refusal to accept copyright.

== See also ==
- Anti-copyright notice
- Copyright abolition
- Culture vs. Copyright
- Criticism of intellectual property
- Criticism of patents
- Creative Commons
- Copyfraud
- Copyleft
- Copyright alternatives
- Fair dealing
- Free culture movement
- Freedom of information
- Freedom of speech
- Good Copy Bad Copy
- Home Recording Rights Coalition
- Information management
- Information wants to be free
- Internet freedom
- Missionary Church of Kopimism
- New Zealand Internet Blackout
- Operation Payback
- Philosophy of copyright
- Pirate Party
- Public domain
- Sci-Hub
- Steal This Film
- Sony Corp. of America v. Universal City Studios, Inc.
- Warez
