= Jean-Baptiste Soufron =

French lawyer (born 1978)

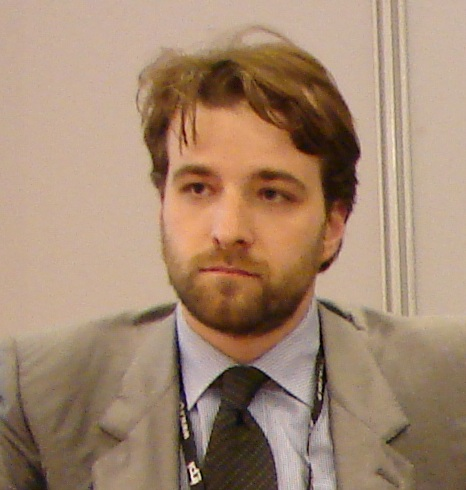
- Jean-Baptiste Soufron in 2010
- Born: 6 April 1978 (age 48); Bordeaux, France
- Occupation: lawyer

Jean-Baptiste Soufron (born 6 April 1978) is a lawyer and writer in Bordeaux, France. He has been an advisor to the French government and the former general secretary of the French National Digital Council (2012–2015).

== Career ==
Soufron graduated from La Sorbonne. He translated The Future of Ideas, a book by Lawrence Lessig into French. He was a consultant for free software and open source companies in 2006.

In 2002, he was a co-founder of and the lawyer for Ligue Odebi, a collective dedicated to defend French internet users in front of the LCEN and DAVDSI bills. In 2004, he was a co-founder of and the lawyer for Audionautes, a nonprofit dedicated to defend internet users threatened by the music industry.

In 2003, he was one of the two lawyer of Jiraf (le Jeu et son Industrie Rassemble leurs Acteurs Français), a nonprofit French association created to find a solution to save the French video games industry at the people level.

In 2004, he was a co-founder of Wikimedia France, the French chapter of the Wikimedia Foundation.

In 2006, during the presidential campaign, he worked with Michel Rocard as one of the authors of the Republic 2.0 report for Ségolène Royal.

He was involved in Wikipedia from the beginning of the project, helping with legal matters before becoming lead legal coordinator and then the chief legal officer of the Wikimedia Foundation (2006–2008).

In 2010, Soufron was the director of the think tank of Cap Digital. He has been writing on open innovation and digital culture in Esprit, and on Internet politics in Dissent. He founded several startups such as Amusement Magazine and the review website nonfiction.fr. As a journalist, he co-hosted the live shows Minuit/Dix and Le Rendez-Vous on France Culture radio.

In 2012, he worked with Fleur Pellerin, an advisor of candidate François Hollande, on the digital economy.

In 2012, after the presidential election, he became the senior advisor on digital economy of the cabinet of the Ministry of Small & Medium-Sized Businesses and Digital Economy.

From 2012 to 2015, he was the general secretary of Conseil national du numérique.

In 2015, he became a partner at the law firm FWPA Avocats in Paris.

== Publications ==
Jean-Baptiste is regularly featured in the press and has a blogs in English and French.

He has published several public reports.

In 2005, for ETSI, he published a report on open source impacts on ICT standardization.

In 2007, for Ségolène Royal, he published the report Republic 2.0 under the direction of Michel Rocard.

In 2008, for Terra Nova, he published a report on the French HADOPI Law. In 2017, again for Terra Nova, he published a report on electoral fraud online.

In 2018, once again for Terra Nova, he published a report on fake news.

He has also participated in several books, including in 2005, when he published the French translation of The Future of Ideas by Lawrence Lessig.

In 2011, he published La révolution libertarienne des monnaies virtuelles in Au-delà de la crise financière, under the direction of Carine Dartiguepeyrou.

In 2012, he published 80 propositions qui ne coûtent pas 80 milliards, under the direction of Patrick Weil.

In April 2020, he co-published the forum entitles "StopCovid est un projet désastreux piloté par des apprentis sorciers" in Le Monde newspaper with sociologist Antonio Cassili and mathematician Paul-Olivier Dehaye, in which the authors claim that the French government is not authorized to consider treatment that will be made of this sensitive information resulting from COVID-19 contact tracing apps
