= Lawrence Liang =

Indian legal academic of Chinese descent

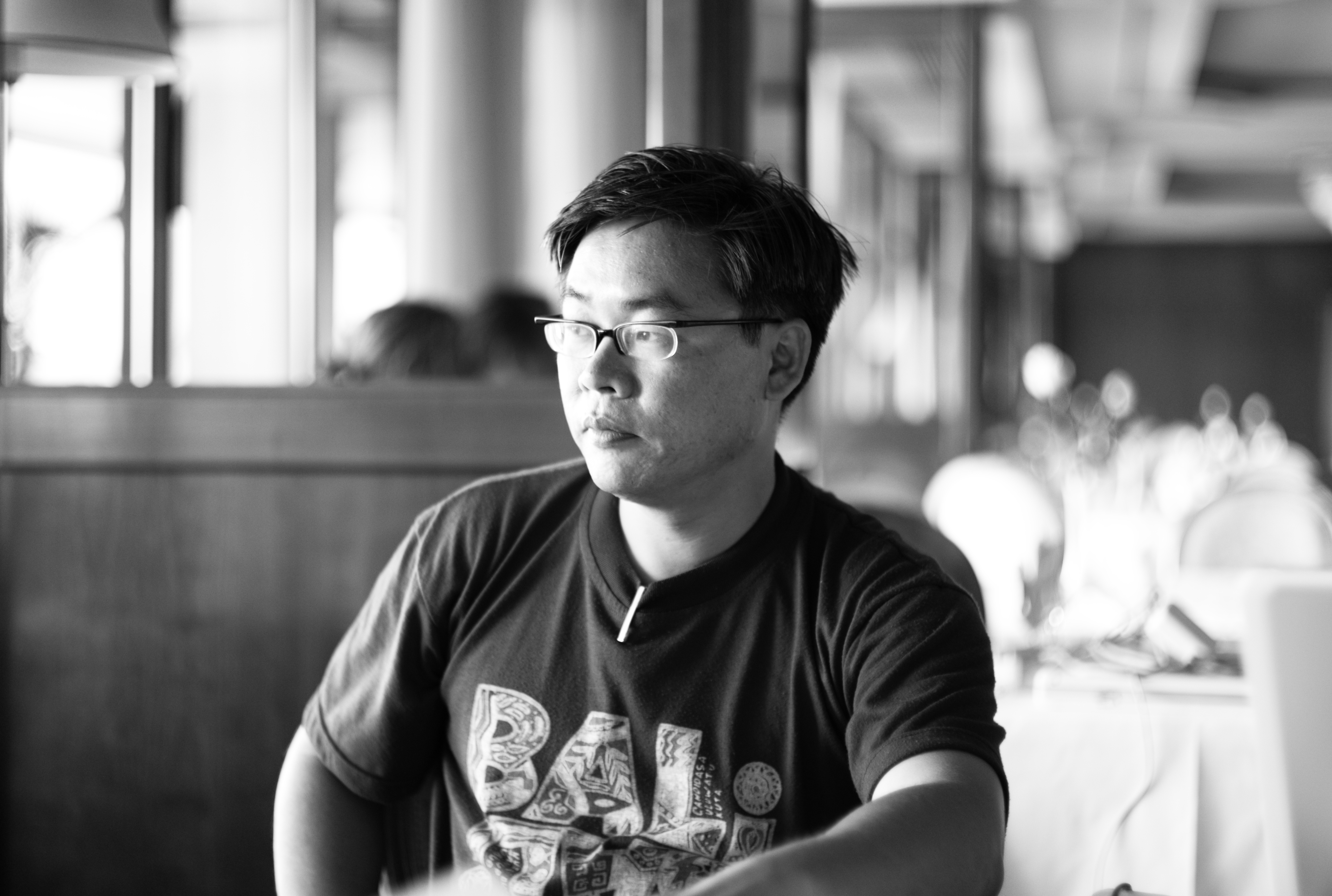
- Lawrence Liang in June 2007; photo by Joi Ito

Lawrence Liang is an Indian academic and lawyer of Chinese descent. He is a professor of law at Ambedkar University Delhi. He is known for his legal campaigns on issues of public concern. He is a co-founder of the Alternative Law Forum and by 2006 had emerged as a spokesperson against the politics of "intellectual property". In 2017, he received the Infosys Prize for Social Sciences in recognition of his creative scholarship on law and society.

Liang's key areas of interest are law, popular culture and content piracy. He has been working closely with Sarai, New Delhi on a joint research project Intellectual Property and the Knowledge/Culture Commons. Liang is a "keen follower of the open source movement in software", Lawrence Liang has been working on ways of translating the open source ideas into the cultural domain. Segments of an interview with Liang commenting extensively on copyright and culture are featured in Steal This Film (Two).

Liang is author of Sex, Laws and Videotape: The Public is Watching (with Mayur Suresh and Namita Avriti Malhotra), published by Public Service Broadcasting Trust and Guide to Open Content Licenses, published by the Piet Zwart Institute in 2004.

== Work ==
He has critiqued and influenced the debate on changes in the Indian Copyright Act. " We were trying to oppose that, showing how such a law would be harmful for creative innovation. Right now we are also supporting a campaign in pharmaceutical policies. But our focus is not so much on policy advocacy, because you cannot really defend the grey economy and be on policy bodies. With regard to government, we try to push for the open-source model, arguing that public money should go into public intellectual property," Liang said in the December 2004 interview to World-Information.org.

In 2004 he was a research fellow at Media Design Research, Piet Zwart Institute, Rotterdam."

== Advisor/mentor ==
Liang was also group advisor/mentor of the 2006–07 International Policy Fellowship of the Open Society Institute.

== JNU Protests ==
During the 2016 protests at Jawaharlal Nehru University where he was a PhD student at the time, Liang gave a public speech as part of an 'Alternative Classroom' on laws relating to sedition.

== Background ==
Liang is a graduate from the National Law School of India University, and pursued a master's degree in Warwick, England on a Chevening Scholarship. He obtained his PhD in Cinema Studies from the School of Arts and Aesthetics at Jawaharlal Nehru University in 2017. He was a visiting scholar at the University of Michigan School of Information and the Center for South Asian Studies as part of the Hughes Fellowship in 2014 and Rice Visiting Scholar at Yale University in 2016-17. He is currently Professor of Law at School of Law, Governance and Citizenship, Ambedkar University Delhi, India.

== See also ==
- Anti-copyright
- Steal This Film
