= Siva Vaidhyanathan =

American academic (born 1966)

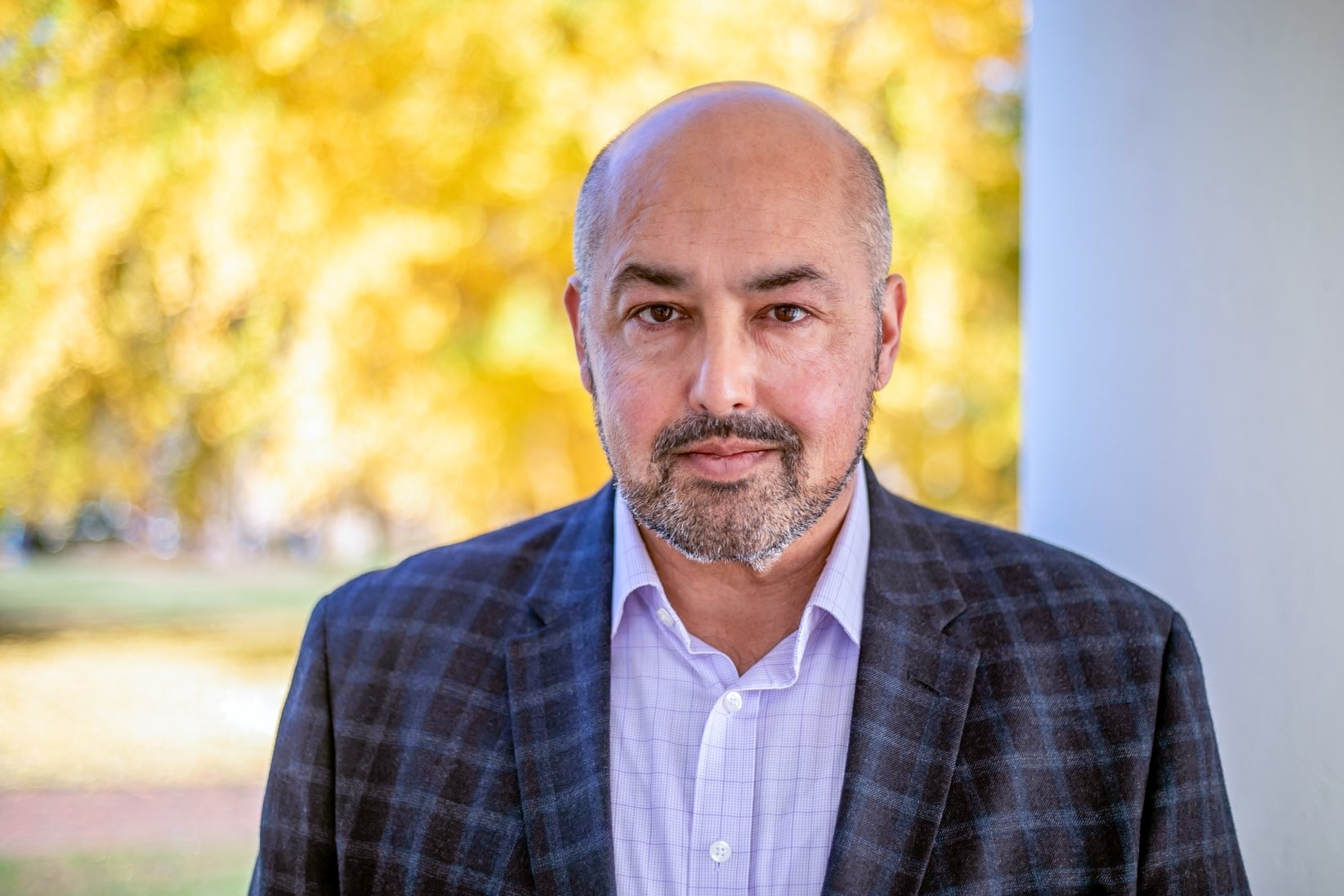
- Born: 1966 (age 59–60); Buffalo, New York, U.S.
- Education: University of Texas at Austin (BA, PhD)
- Occupations: Cultural historian; media scholar

Siva Vaidhyanathan (born 1966) is an American cultural historian and media scholar, and the Robertson professor of Media Studies at the University of Virginia. Vaidhyanathan is a permanent columnist at The Guardian and Slate; he is also a frequent contributor on media and cultural issues in various periodicals including The Chronicle of Higher Education, New York Times Magazine, The Nation, Slate, and The Baffler. He directs the Center for Media and Citizenship at the University of Virginia, which produces a television show, a radio program, several podcasts, and the Virginia Quarterly Review.

== Biography ==
Vaidhyanathan is of Tamil Indian descent. He was born in Buffalo, New York and attended the University of Texas at Austin, earning a BA in History in 1994 and a Ph.D. in 1999 in American Studies. From 1999 through the summer of 2007 he worked in the Department of Culture and Communication at New York University, the School of Library and Information Studies at the University of Wisconsin–Madison and Columbia University. From 1988 through 1993 he was a professional journalist working for several Texas daily newspapers. From 2003-2008 he ran a blog, Sivacracy.net, hosted by the Institute for the Future of the Book, which hosted a number of writers interested in society, education, copyright, technology, and related topics.

He has appeared in an episode of The Daily Show with Jon Stewart to discuss early social network services. Vaidhyanathan has appeared in several documentary films, including Terms and Conditions May Apply (2013), Inside the Mind of Google (2009), and Freedom of Expression (2007). In 2016 Vaidhyanathan played a prominent role in the higher-education documentary, Starving the Beast. Vaidhyanathan was portrayed as a character on stage at the Public Theater in New York City in a play called Privacy (2016).

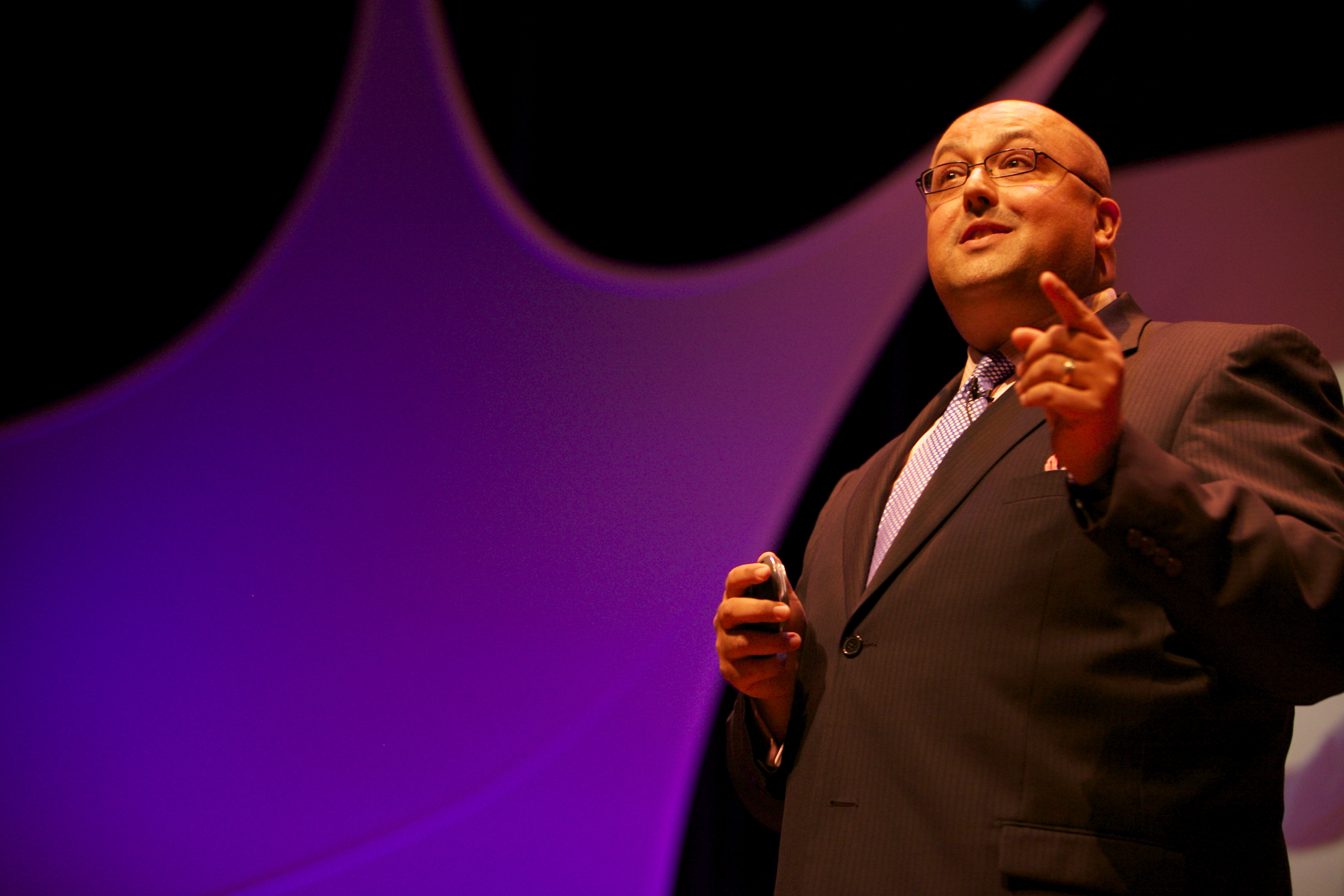
Vaidhyanathan speaking at the 2011 Personal Democracy Forum

Vaidhyanathan is a fellow of the New York Institute for the Humanities and the Institute for the Future of the Book. Vaidhyanathan serves on the board of the Digital Public Library of America.

== Selected books ==
- Copyrights and Copywrongs: The Rise of Intellectual Property and How It Threatens Creativity, NYU Press, 2001. (ISBN 978-0814788073)
- The Anarchist in the Library: How the Clash Between Freedom and Control Is Hacking the Real World and Crashing the System, Basic Books, 2004. (ISBN 978-0465089857)
- Rewiring the Nation: The Place of Technology in American Studies, co-edited with Carolyn de la Peña, Johns Hopkins University Press, 2007. (ISBN 978-0801886515)
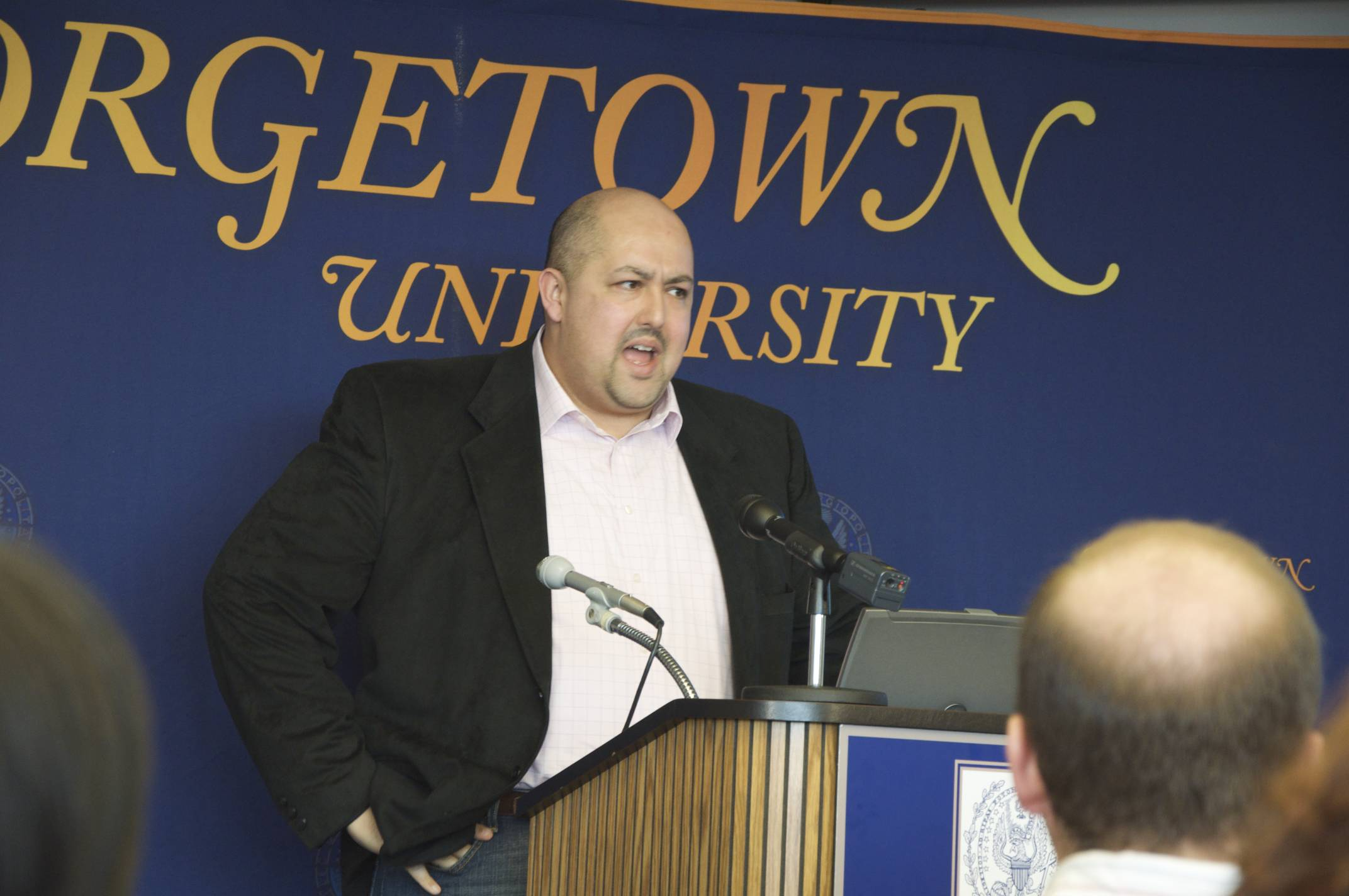
- Vaidhyanathan speaking at Georgetown
  The Googlization of Everything -- and Why We Should Worry, University of California Press, 2011. (ISBN 978-0520258822). The text was in open development on a blog, launched September 27, 2007 in collaboration with the Institute for the Future of the Book.
- Intellectual Property: A Very Short Introduction, Oxford University Press, 2017. (ISBN 9780195372779)
- Antisocial Media: How Facebook Disconnects Us And Undermines Democracy, Oxford University Press, 2018. (ISBN 978-0190841164)

== See also ==
- Anti-copyright
- Good Copy Bad Copy
- Mashup (music)
- Steal This Film
- Googlization
