= Freedom of Expression (book) =

2005 book by Kembrew McLeod

Freedom of Expression®
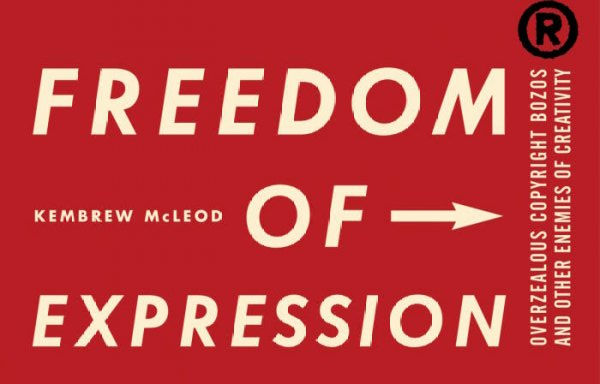
- 2005 edition of book cover
- Author: Kembrew McLeod
- Original title: Freedom of Expression®
- Language: English
- Subject: Freedom of speech, human rights
- Genre: Non-fiction
- Publisher: Doubleday
- Publication date: 2005
- Publication place: United States
- Media type: Hardback
- Pages: 384 pp.
- ISBN: 0-385-51325-9
- OCLC: 55870944

Freedom of Expression® is a book written by Kembrew McLeod about freedom of speech issues involving concepts of intellectual property. The book was first published in 2005 by Doubleday as Freedom of Expression®: Overzealous Copyright Bozos and Other Enemies of Creativity, and in 2007 by University of Minnesota Press as Freedom of Expression®: Resistance and Repression in the Age of Intellectual Property. The paperback edition includes a foreword by Lawrence Lessig. The author recounts a history of the use of counter-cultural artistry, illegal art, and the use of copyrighted works in art as a form of fair use and creative expression. The book encourages the reader to continue such uses in art and other forms of creative expression.

The book received a positive reception and the Intellectual Freedom Round Table of the American Library Association awarded McLeod with the Eli M. Oboler Memorial Award, which honors the "best published work in the area of intellectual freedom". A review in The American Scholar said that McLeod " ... delivers a lively, personal account of the ways intellectual property messes with people—and how he messes with intellectual property." American Book Review said the work is "a clever compendium of examples" for those familiar with its subject matter. The Journal of Popular Culture called it "an informative, thought-provoking, and occasionally laugh-out-loud funny examination of specific ways the privatization of ideas suppresses creativity in contemporary culture." Publishers Weekly said that McLeod's views echo prior comments about intellectual property by academics—including Lessig.

== Background ==
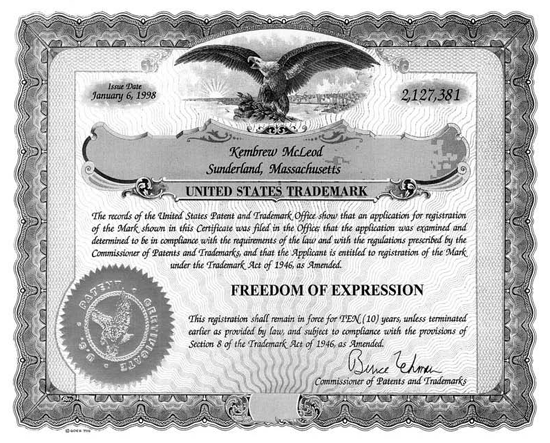
Certificate of registration for "Freedom of Expression" from the United States Patent and Trademark Office (1998)

McLeod first published the book as a compilation of writings in magazine format. Freedom of Expression was first published in book form in 2005 by Doubleday as Freedom of Expression®: Overzealous Copyright Bozos and Other Enemies of Creativity, and in 2007 by University of Minnesota Press as Freedom of Expression®: Resistance and Repression in the Age of Intellectual Property. The 2005 edition of the book was made freely available via a Creative Commons license.

The Media Education Foundation released a DVD documentary film ytyhrtyreyeyeyn 2007 featuring McLeod, Jeremy Smith, Sut Jhally, and Jeremy Earp. The documentary was narrated by Naomi Klein and included interviews with Lessig, Siva Vaidhyanathan—a University of Virginia academic in media studies; Inga Chernyak—a co-founder of Free Culture at New York University, and Mark Hosler of Negativland.

== Contents ==
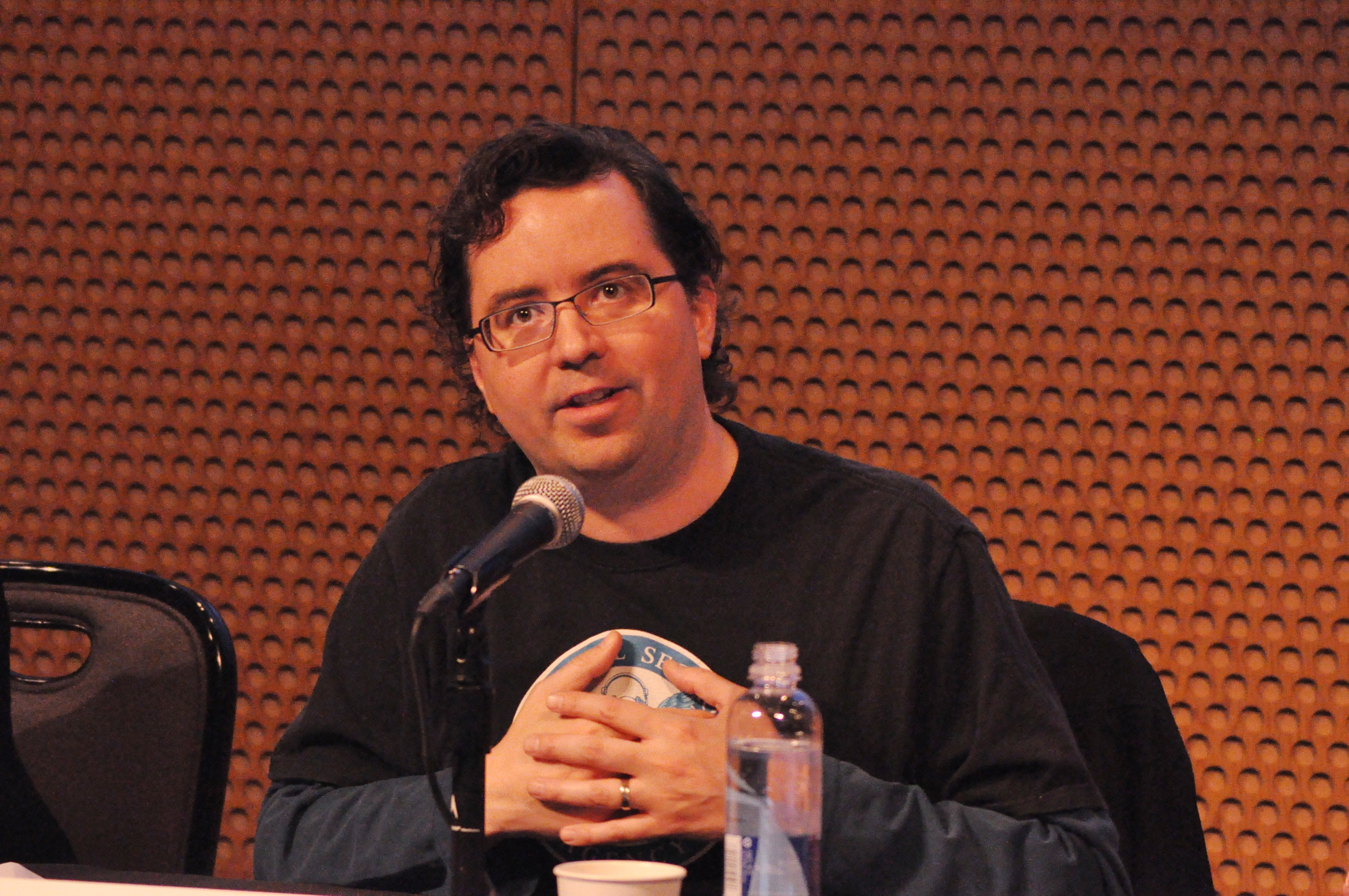
Kembrew McLeod (2010)

In Freedom of Expression®, Kembrew McLeod discusses the concept of freedom of expression regarding cultural norms and the manner in which society allows corporations to influence discourse. McLeod discusses his own pranks, such as his 1998 registration of the phrase "freedom of expression" as a trademark. In 1998, he registered the phrase "Freedom of Expression" as a trademark in the United States, and said he would initiate a lawsuit against individuals who subsequently used this phrase without his permission. McLeod said, "If the ACLU wanted to put out a magazine with [the] title Freedom of Expression, they would have to pay me royalties." After the telecommunications company AT&T used the phrase during a marketing campaign, McLeod's attorney sent a cease and desist letter to request that AT&T stop using his trademarked phrase. In his book Owning Culture: Authorship, Ownership, and Intellectual Property Law, McLeod said that his intention with the registration of "Freedom of Expression" was to initiate social commentary in the media, saying, "I would let the news story itself be the social commentary." The trademarked phrase subsequently fell back into the public domain.

McLeod also discusses the history of counter-cultural artistry, recounting episodes such as Dadaist art styles and an incident in which Vanna White initiated a lawsuit against a robot likeness for copyright infringement. He explores the concept of fair use and encourages the reader to use copyrighted works in alternative forms of artwork. He also gives a history of the song "Happy Birthday to You", information about the music industry's use of sampling, and discusses illegal art. McLeod said that the threat of a lawsuit from a company is not necessarily an indication of actual criminal activity, and these threats against artistry and creativity can be overcome through determination.

== Reception ==
In 2006, the Intellectual Freedom Round Table (IFRT)—a committee of the American Library Association (ALA)—awarded McLeod the Eli M. Oboler Memorial Award, which recognizes the "best published work in the area of intellectual freedom." In a press release statement upon presenting McLeod with the award, Committee Chair Fred Stielow commented, "McLeod captures the growing switch from a balanced compromise between the creator's rights and public access. In its place, the author wittily exposes a stifling shift of copyright law into an instrument of commercial interests." McLeod was the only recipient of the Eli M. Oboler Memorial Award in 2006.

In a review of the book for The American Scholar, Siva Vaidhyanathan of New York University wrote that MacLeod " ... delivers a lively, personal account of the ways intellectual property messes with people—and how he messes with intellectual property", and that, "McLeod is ironic and witty, writing with a hip-hop-influenced youth-savvy diction that demonstrates his confidence and engagement with the material and the culture that means so much to him." Davis Schneiderman wrote positively of the work in a review for American Book Review, comparing it to similar works on the subject matter, including No Logo: Taking Aim at the Brand Bullies (2000) by Naomi Klein, and writings of Michael Moore and Al Franken.

A review by Eric Anderson of Bowling Green State University in the Journal of Popular Culture praised the author's use of interviews throughout the book, writing that it " ... shines with McLeod's broad use of interviews ... [he] records and reports the voices of creative people who have been encumbered by the contemporary intellectual property regime. The incorporation of these interviews, demonstrating as they do specific examples of creativity obstructed in specific ways, is this book's most important contribution." Anderson said the book is "an informative, thought-provoking, and occasionally laugh-out-loud funny examination of specific ways the privatization of ideas suppresses creativity in contemporary culture." Anderson mentions McLeod's and the book's publisher's uncommon tactic of making the book freely available via a Creative Commons license.

Publishers Weekly reviewed the book and compared McLeod's tactic of following his trademarked phrase with "®" as a satire of Fox Network's registration of the phrase "fair and balanced" as a trademark. The reviewer wrote, "While McLeod's arguments aren't original, his entertaining examples and punchy writing nicely amplify the concerns voiced by an increasing number of intellectual property scholars, such as Lawrence Lessig." The reviewer said of the author's tone, "Although he evokes dark, almost Orwellian images throughout, McLeod manages an upbeat spin, citing the 'egalitarian' nature of the new technologies and a growing awareness of the need to return to a place where 'freedom of expression' is once again 'a meaningful concept that guides our political, social and creative lives.'"

== See also ==
- Censorship
- Censorship in the United States
- Freedom of speech by country
- Freedom of speech in the United States
- Freedom of the press
- International Freedom of Expression Exchange
