= Jorge Cortell =

Jorge Cortell is an activist and commentator known for his opposition to the concept of Intellectual Property. He was forced to resign as visiting professor of the Polytechnic University of Valencia (UPV) after delivering a talk in the university where he defended copyleft and P2P networks, and criticized copyright and patents, defying pressure from the dean and the MPAA who tried to censor his talk.

== Work ==
Cortell, a serial entrepreneur, is currently founder and CEO of Kanteron systems a precision medicine software company whose story was picked up by Microsoft's news site. He's also a European Commission Member of the Expert Group on Venture Philanthropy and Social Investments.

Cortell has founded La Resistencia Digital and has actively cooperated with the Creative Commons and the FFII. He was president of the Oxford University Society Valencia and a member of the Free Software Foundation, the Electronic Frontier Foundation, AI (Asociación de Internautas, mainly in Spanish) and Hispalinux.

== Controversy ==
In May 2005 Spanish newspapers reported widely on an attempt by Universitat Politècnica de Valencia in Spain to block a talk by Cortell. The story was reportedly picked up by a large number of bloggers and Cortell resigned from his post at the university.

Cortell was invited by the ETSIA Student Union and Linux Users' Group to give a talk at the university analysing P2P networks. At the time Cortell was a teaching assistant on intellectual property at the Universitat Politècnica de Valencia. On May 4, 2005, he was forced to resign, after his very critical talk on Intellectual Property. Cortell eventually gave the talk at the university cafeteria.

Some months after the incident, the dean admitted that he had been pressured by the Spanish Recording Industry Association (Promusicae) in a quote to the national newspaper El País, and also by the MPAA as appeared in another newspaper.

== Speeches ==
=== In English ===
- 2006-07-23 New York. HOPE6 Selfness-Copyfight: From Censorship to New Business Models Video and Audio at archive.org slideshow PDF
- 2005-11-17 Oslo, Faculty of Engineering, organized by the NUUG. Free culture, P2P networks, alternative economic models, and why some people do not want freedom.
- 2004-09-14 Stanford university. Free culture for all: a sustainable real example.

Free culture for all. A sustainable real example - part 1 of 2
License: Creative Commons by-2.5.

Free culture for all. A sustainable real example - part 2 of 2
License: Creative Commons by-2.5.

=== In Spanish ===
- 2005-12-21 Madrid, Centro de Convenciones Mapfre. Suidad: Un mundo sin copyright, as part of the Hispalinux Congress.
- 2005-11-21 Sevilla, Facultad de Comunicación of the Universidad de Sevilla. Round table "Música y derechos de propiedad intellectual", composed by a SGAE representer, an AIE member, Pedro of Zemos98.org, the singer Kiko Veneno, the sister of María Jiménez, the producer Antonio Escobar and Cortell. Eventually, both SGAE and AIE members did not come to the round table alleging personal problems with one of the members of the table, Cortell himself.
- 2005-11-21 Murcia, Facultad de Informática, Universidad de Murcia. On the circle of conferences of its patronal festivities.
- 2005-11-16 Barcelona, Ateneu Barcelonés. Round table of the Campaña contra la Trazabilidad sin orden judicial (Campaign against traceability without order from judge), with David de Ugarte(Ciberpunk) and Javier Cuchí (Asociación de Internautas).
- 2005-11-12 A coruño, Coliseum de A Coruña.
- 2005-11-10 Vigo, Edificio Miralles, of Ciudad Universitaria, Campus de Vigo. Part of Charlas-conferencias sobre el copyleft, la música, etc., organized by the Vicerrectorado de Extensión Universitaria of the Universidad de Vigo. With David Bravo and Ignasi Labastida.
- 2005-10-31 Murcia, Murcia Lan Party.
- 2005-10-31 Tarragona, Sala Santiago Costa de la Diputació. Part of the Tinet congress, organized by OASI.
- 2005-10-15 Mataró, Centro Cívico Pla d¡en Boet. Round Table Creative Commons vs Devolución, with Iñigo Medina, Pere Quintana and Ignasi Labastida. Part of the IV Semana de las Nuevas Tecnologías para todos, organized by the Ajuntament de Mataró and the Fundación Tecnocampus.
- 2005-08-10 Málaga, Fuente de Piedra. Semana del software libre en Fuente de Piedra.
- 2005-07-20 to 2005-07-31 Valencia, Campus Party. Round Table Modelos de Negocio alternativos, conference Lo que no quieren que sepas de tu ordenador e Internet.
- 2005-06-19 Alicante, Universidad de Alicante - Campus San Vicente del Raspeig. Propiedad Intellectual y Software Libre / Patentes de Software, as part of the La alternativa del software libre en la sociedad de la información program.
- 2005-07-15 Málaga, Málaga LAN Party. Las redes P2P y la entelequia de la Propiedad Intellectual
- 2005-06-16 Córdoba, La Rambla. Jornadas Software Libre e Internet
- 2005-06-09 Barcelona, Internet Global Congress. Globalización, propiedad intellectual y licencias abiertas.
- 2005-06-08 Barcelona, Centro de Cultura Contemporánea de Barcelona. Derechos de autor y Software Libre, las claves en la difusión del conocimiento para las bibliotecas, organized by the Grupo de Trabajo de Software Libre para los profesionales de la información of Colegio Oficial de Bibliotecarios y Documentalistas de Catalunya.
- 2005-06-07 Barcelona, Auditorio Caixa Catalunya (La Pedrera). El acceso a las TIC ¿Un derecho humano fundamental?, given together with Marcelo d'Elia Branco, as part of the II Jornadas Internet y Solidaridad.
- 2005-05-27 Barcelona, Universitat Pompeu Fabra. Audio torrent .
- 2005-05-26 Alicante, Universidad de Alicante. Round table ¿Hace falta una nueva ley/cultura de propiedad intellectual? inside the Copy ¿Right? journeys. Participants on the round table include Antonio Martínez, from SGAE, and Gabriel Marín, an attorney specialized in intellectual property and teacher at the Universidad de Alicante . Audio part one, part two, part three. Video .
- 2005-05-25 Madrid, Universidad Politécnica de Madrid, Facultad de Informática.
- 2005-05-06 Basque Country software libre en la empresa .
- 2005-05-04 Valencia, Universitat Politècnica de Valencia The cursed speech
- 2005-04-22 Granada Los peligros de las Patentes de Software. Video
- 2004-04-17 Barcelona.- Seminario jurídico: leyes de propiedad intellectual, licencias y patentes inside the II Jornadas Copyleft together with Andrea Cappoci (Laser, Italia) and Thomas Margoni.

== See also ==
- Anti-copyright
- Copyright
- Intellectual Property
