= Amusement (magazine) =

French magazine dedicated to video games and digital entertainment

- Editor-in-Chief, Founder: Abdel Bounane
- Categories: Video game
- Frequency: Quarterly
- Publisher: Amusement
- First issue: May 2008
- Country: France
- Based in: Paris
- Language: French
- Website: amusement.net
- ISSN: 1961-8018

Amusement is the quarterly high-range French magazine dedicated to video games and digital entertainment. Its first issue was published in May 2008. This magazine of approximately 200 pages is distributed in France and in many English-speaking countries.The magazine has been mainly lauded for the very new and artistic way to represent digital entertainment and videogames. It has been founded by Abdel Bounane and Jean-Baptiste Soufron.

== People interviewed ==
Since its launch, Amusement has interviewed renowned personalities such as the science fiction writers William Gibson and Michael Moorcock, Sony Computer CEO Kaz Hirai, game designers Will Wright, Tetsuya Mizuguchi, David Cage, Masachika Kawata, Kenji Eno, Keita Takahashi, Jun Takeuchi, Jordan Mechner, Guillaume de Fondaumiere, the inventor Jacque Fresco, artists Enki Bilal, Ito Morabito, Jean-Charles de Castelbajac, Miltos Manetas, Jodi, Blast Theory, Michel Gondry, Peter Molyneux, Uwe Boll, musicians Alizée, Cœur de pirate, Santigold, Yelle, Midnight Juggernauts, Phoenix, Turzi, Oxmo Puccino and actresses Sara Forestier, Alysson Paradis, Helena Noguerra and French Minister Nathalie Kosciusko-Morizet.

== Issues ==
First issue : "The new player takes over"
Second issue : "Castelbajac, digital creator in Spore"
Third issue : "Jap/On&Off"
Fourth issue : "Magic! The internet makes your magazine alive"
Fifth issue : "Sara Forestier, an actress in The Sims 3"
Sixth issue : "The bugged issue !"
Seventh issue : "Helena Noguerra, Virtual in Heavy Rain"
Eight issue : Politechnology : Politics x Digital

== Media coverage ==
Amusement gained worldwide reputation in April 2009 when its 4th issue was the first magazine containing an RFID tag, connecting to the Internet and giving access to digital art and videogames exclusively for the owner of the magazine.

The publication also made big internet buzz when it released the "PIXXXEL" editorial in January 2009. Since this editorial, Amusement regularly releases editorial cited by numerous blogs or websites : "Made of Myth" or "Overheating" were cited the same day by Gizmodo, Engadget, Kotaku, Destructoid and many other sites.

In Europe, Amusement has been lauded as "a revolutionizing videogame magazine", by national daily, weekly or monthly newspapers French most important newspaper Le Monde said Amusement had "An attractive result", other well established daily newspaper Libération said "The magazine, first published a year ago, succeeded in finding its marks, and managed to balance leading articles, surprising photo shoots, and unconventional subjects". Technikart "Vanity Fair, now on icy paper and for gamers", Challenge(s) : "An upscale magazine for adult players. [...] AMUSEMENT revolutionizes the video game press", Micro Hebdo : "Original and unseen"; Le Figaro "Speaking differently of video game", Le Nouvel Observateur : "The first lifestyle magazine dedicated to numerical life"; L'expansion : A true magazine-object"; Stratégie : "Not for small players"; 20 Minutes : "Vogue, dipped into a soup of nerd"; Les Inrockuptibles "An upscale and erudite quarterly [...] An ambitious quarterly"; The Daily Telegraph : "The future of the press ?"

Amusement is also part of LEBOOK, the worldwide Who's who for the creative industry
