= Luis Villa =

American computer programmer and lawyer

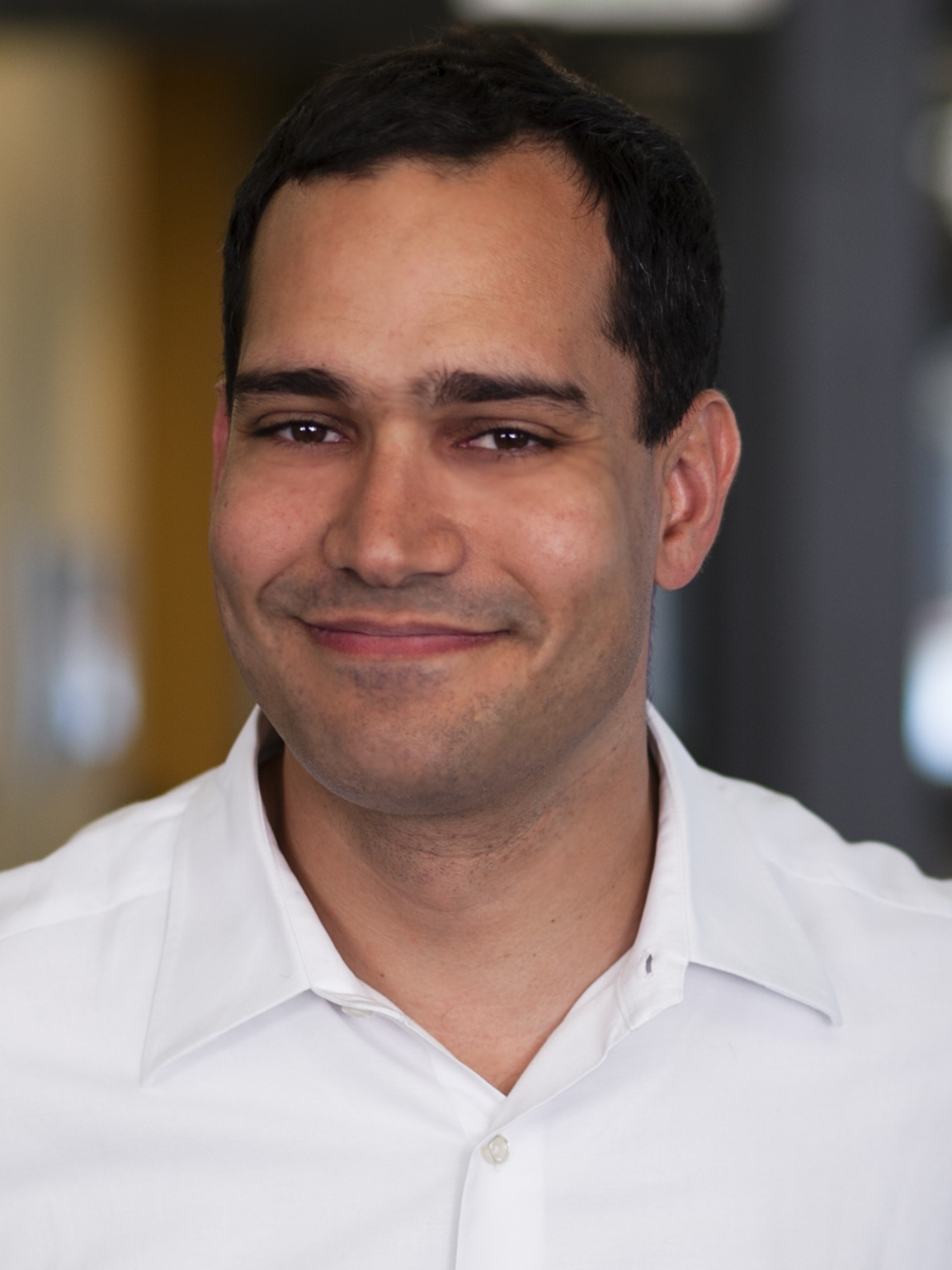
- Villa in 2013
- Education: Columbia Law School
- Occupation: Lawyer
- Website: lu.is

Luis Villa is an American attorney and programmer who is co-founder and general counsel for Tidelift.

Previously he worked as deputy general counsel and then as senior director of community engagement at the Wikimedia Foundation, and prior to that he was an attorney at Mozilla, where he worked on the revision of the Mozilla Public License (MPL). He continued that work in his next job at Greenberg Traurig, where he was part of the team defending Google against Oracle's claims concerning Android.

Prior to graduating from Columbia Law School in 2009, he was an employee at Ximian, which was acquired by Novell in 2003. He spent a year as a "senior geek in residence" at Harvard's Berkman Center for Internet & Society working on StopBadware.org. He was editor-in-chief of the Columbia Science and Technology Law Review in 2008.

He has served on the boards of directors of the GNOME Foundation, the Open Source Initiative, and Creative Commons.

He co-founded Tidelift, a company that helps others manage open-source software, where he was the legal lead as of 2024.

== See also ==
- List of Wikipedia people
