= David K. Levine =

American economist

- Born: David Knudsen Levine c. 1955 (age 70–71)

Academic background
- Education: University of California, Los Angeles (BA, MA); Massachusetts Institute of Technology (PhD)
- Doctoral advisor: Peter Diamond

Academic work
- Discipline: Game theory, General equilibrium Theory
- Institutions: University of California, Los Angeles; Washington University in St. Louis; European University Institute; Royal Holloway, University of London
- Doctoral students: Guido Tabellini
- Notable ideas: Learning in games, Folk theorem
- Website: Information at IDEAS / RePEc

David Knudsen Levine (born c. 1955) is an American economist. He is the Leverhulme International Professor of Economics at Royal Holloway, University of London; Robert Schuman Center for Advanced Study Joint Chair at the European University Institute; and the John H. Biggs Distinguished Professor of Economics Emeritus at Washington University in St. Louis. He previously taught at UCLA where he held the Armen Alchian Chair in Economic Theory and twice served as chair of the department. His research includes the study of intellectual property and endogenous growth in dynamic general equilibrium models, the endogenous formation of preferences, social norms and institutions, learning in games, and game theory applications to experimental economics.

== Biography ==
At UCLA, Levine obtained a B.A. in mathematics in 1977, and an M.A. in economics in the same year. He was awarded a Ph.D. in economics at MIT in June 1981. He became an assistant professor of economics at UCLA in July 1981, an associate professor of economics at the University of Minnesota in 1987, and a professor of economics at UCLA in the same year. In 1997 he became the Armen Alchian Professor of Economics at UCLA. In 2006, he moved to Washington University in St. Louis, where he became the John H. Biggs Distinguished Professor of Economics. In 2023, he became the Leverhulme International Professor of Economics at Royal Holloway, University of London.

Levine was the coeditor of the Review of Economic Dynamics from November 1996 to June 2001, and of Econometrica from July 2003 to June 2008. He presided the Society for Economic Dynamics from July 2006 to June 2009.

Levine is a Fellow of the Econometric Society since 1989 and a research associate at NBER since 2006.

== Research ==
David K. Levine conducts ongoing research in general equilibrium theory, focusing specifically on growth theory, innovation, and intellectual property. Collaborating with Michele Boldrin, Levine examines the role of increasing returns in growth and innovation. They posit that little evidence exists for increasing returns at the aggregate level, and thus argue that there is no reason to believe that increasing returns play an important role in growth. This theory concludes that existing claims for the necessity of intellectual property in the process of growth and innovation are greatly exaggerated.

Levine also conducts research in the field of dynamic games. He established with Drew Fudenberg that a long-lived player playing in opposition to short-lived players can substitute reputation for commitment. He developed with Eric Maskin the first "folk theorem" for games in which players do not directly observe each other's decisions, with applications for learning in games. They argued that while learning theories cannot provide detailed descriptions of non-equilibrium behavior, they act as a useful tool in understanding which equilibria are likely to emerge. One example of this, they put forward, explains how superstitions survive in the face of rational learning.

Levine currently studies the endogenous formation of preferences and social norms. His analysis of experimental anomalies explores some of the limitations of the standard economic model of self-interested individuals.

In his article The Case Against Patents he argues that patents create an equilibrium effect where they incentivize inventions, especially when the patent system is well designed. However, these systems are too susceptible to pressures, so to create more innovation, the patent system should be abolished in exchange for a system that is less open to lobbying.

== Publications ==
- The Theory of Learning in Games, co-author with Drew Fudenberg
- Against Intellectual Monopoly, co-author with Michele Boldrin

=== Working papers ===
- http://www.dklevine.com/papers.htm

=== Podcast ===
- http://www.dklevine.com/podcasts.xml
