= Regulatory Authority for Audiovisual and Digital Communication =

French media watchdog agency

- Established: 1 January 2022 (4 years ago)
- Legal status: Independent public authority
- Directors: Martin Ajdari
- Budget: 49,900,000 euro (2025)
- Employees: 355 (2022)
- Website: arcom.fr

The Regulatory Authority for Audiovisual and Digital Communication (Autorité de régulation de la communication audiovisuelle et numérique; ARCOM) is the French independent administrative agency resulting from the merger on 1 January 2022 of the High Audiovisual Council (CSA) and the High Authority for the Distribution of Works and Protection of Rights on the Internet (Hadopi). ARCOM is responsible for both audiovisual and digital communications.

Among its objectives are the fight against digital piracy, and illegal mirror sites. In addition, legislative measures have been taken to give the agency new powers in the fight against the illegal broadcasting of sports events and competitions.

In addition to protection of minors by content classification and the required notification by publishers of works subject to restrictions, additional public protection initiatives are provided for by the Law Against Manipulation of Information (also known as the "Loi fake news"—fake news law), the Law Against Hateful Content on the Internet ("Avia law"), the Law Reinforcing the Respect of Principles of the Republic (the "non-separatism" law), and the law against violence against women.

== See also ==
- Autorité de Régulation des Communications Électroniques, des Postes et de la Distribution de la Presse (ARCEP)
- Copyright aspects of downloading and streaming
- Copyright law of France
- DADVSI
- Graduated response
- Ley Sinde
- Superior Council of Artistic and Literary Property
- Telecoms Package
