= La Quadrature du Net =

French digital-rights advocacy group

- Abbreviation: LQDY
- Formation: 2008; 18 years ago
- Founders: Philippe Aigrain, Benjamin Bayart, Laurent Chemla, Lionel Maurel, Benjamin Sonntag, Félix Tréguer, Laurence Wandewalle, Jérémie Zimmermann
- Type: non-profit organization
- Legal status: Organization
- Purpose: Law, Freedom, Privacy
- Headquarters: 115 Rue de Ménilmontant, 75020, Paris, France
- Region served: Worldwide
- Official language: French, English, Spanish
- Staff: 7
- Website: www.laquadrature.net

La Quadrature du Net protesting against the HADOPI law

La Quadrature du Net (Squaring the Net in French) is a French advocacy group that promotes digital rights and freedoms for its citizens. It advocates for French and European legislation to respect the founding principles of the Internet, most notably the free circulation of knowledge. La Quadrature du Net engages in public-policy debates concerning, for instance, freedom of speech, copyright, regulation of telecommunications and online privacy.

== Etymology ==
The name of the group is based on squaring the circle (French: quadrature du cercle), an unsolvable mathematical problem. According to the collective, it is "impossible to effectively control the flow of information in the digital age by law and technology without harming public freedoms and damaging economic and social development". The collective makes an analogy with the squaring of the circle as a problem that could take ages for people to realize is impossible to solve, as initially intended.

== Creation and structure ==
The group was founded in 2008 by free software promoters and activists.

In 2013, the collective re-organized from a de facto association to a formal (French law) association. This association was founded by 9 long-time participants or helpers of the initial collective.

== Leadership ==
Philippe Aigrain, author of two books on information commons, is one of the co-founders of the collective and the association. Jérémie Zimmermann, also co-founder of both collective and association, is frequently invited to television programs and interviews, defending and raising awareness about the association's positions and opposition to the many projects they consider threaten fundamental liberties and the Internet (French HADOPI law, European Telecoms Package, ACTA, Net Neutrality, etc.

== Actions ==
La Quadarature du Net gained notoriety by fighting the HADOPI law, a controversial project to establish a graduated response in France. Its action against Internet censorship and supporting Net neutrality led the Quadrature to work on subjects such as the LOPPSI law, the Telecoms Package or ACTA. In 2012 Quadrature spokesman and co-founder Jérémie Zimmermann received a Pioneer award for his action against ACTA.

== Recognition and support ==
The Quadrature is supported by other advocacy and free software groups, including the Electronic Frontier Foundation and the Free Software Foundation.

== See also ==
- April (French association)
- Network neutrality
- Bits of Freedom
- Open Rights Group
