= Stop43 =

UK-based digital rights group

Stop43 is a UK-based digital rights group that lobbies on behalf of photographers for the preservation of their copyrights. They ran a viral campaign in 2010 to oppose a change in British law that would have removed copyright protection from orphaned works. The campaign was successful.

In 2011 they proposed offering an “e-Bay-style trading marketplace for images” Unlike some alternative registration programs, images would be registered and marked at no charge to the image producer.

== See also ==
- Digital Economy Act 2010
- Open Rights Group
