= Stephen Carter, Baron Carter of Barnes =

Scottish businessman and former political advisor

The Right Honourable The Lord Carter of Barnes CBE

Parliamentary Under-Secretary of State for Communications, Technology and Broadcasting
- In office 10 October 2008 – 23 July 2009
- Prime Minister: Gordon Brown
- Preceded by: Margaret Hodge
- Succeeded by: Barbara Follett

Downing Street Chief of Staff
- Acting; 23 January 2008 – 10 October 2008
- Prime Minister: Gordon Brown
- Preceded by: Tom Scholar
- Succeeded by: Jeremy Heywood

Member of the House of Lords
- Lord Temporal
- Life peerage 15 October 2008 – 28 March 2025

Personal details
- Born: 12 February 1964 (age 62) Falkirk, Scotland, UK
- Party: Labour
- Education: University of Aberdeen, London Business School

Stephen Andrew Carter, Baron Carter of Barnes, CBE (born 12 February 1964), is a Scottish businessman and politician. Starting his career as graduate trainee rising to CEO of J Walter Thompson UK & Ireland and COO of NTL UK & Ireland (now Virgin Media), in 2003 Carter became the founding CEO of Ofcom (Office of Communications) in the United Kingdom. He was subsequently the group CEO of Brunswick Group from 2007 until 2008, when he stepped down to join the administration of Prime Minister Gordon Brown, Initially serving in 2008 as Brown's chief of strategy, principal advisor, and the Acting Downing Street Chief of Staff, he was very briefly Minister for Communications, Technology and Broadcasting for 9 months in 2008-9. Between 2010 and 2013 he held various management positions at Alcatel-Lucent, and in 2013 he became the group CEO of Informa, an information and events company.

== Early life and education ==
Born in Falkirk, Scotland on 12 February 1964, Stephen Carter grew up in Edinburgh. His father worked for the logistics company Christian Salvesen, and Carter would often travel to London with his family. He was educated at Currie High School in Edinburgh. In 1982 he began studying law at the University of Aberdeen, serving as student president in 1985 and 1986. He graduated in 1987 with a Bachelor of Laws, then attended Harvard Business School's six-week advanced management program in 1997. In 2010 he was awarded an honorary doctorate in law (LLD) by his alma mater, Aberdeen University.

== Career ==
=== JWT and NTL ===
Carter joined the firm J Walter Thompson (JWT) in 1986 as a graduate trainee, specializing in media and technology. In 1994 JWT named him managing director and CEO of J Walter Thompson Company UK & Ireland. He then became JWT's managing director in 1995 and chief executive in 1997.

In 2000 Carter was appointed the chief operating officer and managing director of UK cable TV company NTL UK & Ireland (now Virgin Media). The company was deeply in debt, and Carter helped oversee complete restructuring of the UK & Ireland business. Given debts of £12 billion and market conditions, the company was required to file for Chapter 11 bankruptcy protection, with Carter presiding over the bankruptcy proceedings. The company was still in Chapter 11 when he left in 2003. His compensation payoff, rumored to be close to £1.5 million with a £600,000 bonus, met with criticism from shareholders, and in late 2007 the company resolved a class action lawsuit brought by shareholders by paying out $9 million in compensation.

=== Ofcom and Brunswick ===
On 1 March 2003 Carter became the founding CEO of Ofcom (Office of Communications), the British government's new media regulator. Among other issues, Carter focused on regulating broadband prices and coordinating regulation of switching from analog to digital television broadcasting. He also led negotiations with BT on matters such as local loop bundling. Stepping down from Ofcom in the summer of 2006, he was a part of the capability review team in 2006 and 2007 that reviewed the Department for International Development.

He briefly became the group chief executive officer of Brunswick Group LLP on 1 March 2007, in what was a newly created position. He resigned from the role in January 2008 to join the administration of Prime Minister Gordon Brown. At that time, he also stepped down as a commissioner of the UK Commission for Employment & Skills and non-executive director of Royal Mail Holdings and Travis Perkins.

=== Public positions ===
He was acting chief of strategy and principal advisor for Prime Minister Gordon Brown. Serving as Brown's Acting Downing Street Chief of Staff, he was given responsibility for running political strategy, research, communications, and the Policy Unit. Replaced within a year, Carter was subsequently appointed Brown's communications minister in the House of Lords, and in October 2008 he became the Parliamentary Under-Secretary for three departments simultaneously: serving as Minister for Communications, Technology and Broadcasting and heading the Department for Business, Enterprise and Regulatory Reform and the Department for Culture, Media and Sport. Because Carter was not a Member of Parliament having never been elected to public office, it was necessary to appoint him to the House of Lords for the ministerial positions. He was created Baron Carter of Barnes, of Barnes in the London Borough of Richmond upon Thames on 15 October 2008, introduced to the House of Lords by Lord Currie and Lord Puttnam. He served in the House of Lords on the front bench in his capacity as Minister.

In June 2009 he was again appointed but almost immediately resigned as Parliamentary Under-Secretary for three departments: the Department for Culture, Media and Sport, the Department for Business, Innovation and Skills, and the Department for Communications, Technology and Broadcasting. As Minister for Communications, Technology & Broadcasting, he commissioned and helped write The Digital Britain Report policy document, which "set out the groundwork for subsequent policies in areas such as superfast broadband," for example the Digital Economy Act 2010. Carter announced on 11 June 2009 that he would be resigning from his ministerial post in July 2009, shortly after the publishing of Digital Britain.

Carter entirely vacated his brief political life, and not voted or spoken in the House of Lords since December 2009. He retired from the Lords on 28 March 2025.

=== Alcatel ===
In April 2010 Carter joined the French-American company Alcatel-Lucent, becoming director of marketing, strategy and communications and relocating from London to Paris. This was a private profit role that benefitted from his previous regulatory and ministerial roles. His official titles as of 2010 were executive vice president and chief strategy & marketing officer. Beyond serving as a managing director, he became the company's president of operations in Europe, the Middle East and Africa. He returned to London and officially retired from Alcatel-Lucent in April 2013, although he continued to work on special projects for the company through that summer.

=== Informa ===
Carter was appointed a director of the board of Informa, an information services group, in 2010. In 2013, the Informa board unanimously voted to appoint him as CEO, succeeding Peter Rigby, in July 2013 - a role he assumed in early 2014. As CEO of the company he maintained the focus on investing in subscriptions, bookings and sponsorship, as well as expanding in international conferences such as the Monaco Yacht Show. Under Carter, in 2016 the company acquired the American events company Penton for £1.2 billion. In January 2018, Informa announced the proposed acquisition of UBM, an events group, for £3.9 billion. Carter, who became chief executive of the combined group, said at that point that he would retain the other parts of Informa, including business intelligence and its academic publishing business Taylor & Francis.

== Boards and committees ==
Previously serving on the boards of companies such Travis Perkins, Royal Mail, and 2Wire, he was the chairman of Ashridge Business School from 2008 until 2015. Carter became a trustee of the Royal Shakespeare Company in 2007, where he is currently a governor, and he has been a director at Informa since 2010. As of 2010 he was a vice president of UNICEF, and that year UNICEF UK granted him an honorary fellowship, with Carter becoming a trustee. After becoming a director at United Utilities Group in 2014, he became chairman of the company's corporate responsibility committee in 2016. In 2017 he was named a director for the Department for Business, Energy and Industrial Strategy (BEIS).

== Personal life ==
Carter and his wife, Anna, have two children together. His personal interests include running, Chelsea F.C., and the arts.

Government offices
Preceded by Tom Scholar	Downing Street Chief of Staff; 2008	Succeeded by Jeremy Heywood
Preceded by Margaret Hodge	Minister for Communications, Technology and Broadcasting; 2008 – 2009	Succeeded by Barbara Follett
Orders of precedence in the United Kingdom
Preceded by Peter Mandelson	Gentlemen; Baron Carter of Barnes	Followed by The Lord Pannick
