= ARCOM =

ARCOM may refer to:

- Army Commendation Medal
- Regulatory Authority for Audiovisual and Digital Communication
