= Digital Economy Act 2010 =

UK law regulating digital media

Digital Economy Act 2010 (Note: Section 48.)
- Act of Parliament
- Parliament of the United Kingdom
- Long title: An Act to make provision about the functions of the Office of Communications; to make provision about the online infringement of copyright and about penalties for infringement of copyright and performers’ rights; to make provision about internet domain registries; to make provision about the functions of the Channel Four Television Corporation; to make provision about the regulation of television and radio services; to make provision about the regulation of the use of the electromagnetic spectrum; to amend the Video Recordings Act 1984; to make provision about public lending right in relation to electronic publications; and for connected purposes.
- Citation: 2010 c. 24
- Introduced by: Ben Bradshaw MP, Secretary of State for Culture, Media and Sport (Commons); Peter Mandelson, Secretary of State for Business, Innovation and Skills (Lords)
- Territorial extent: England and Wales; Scotland; Northern Ireland; (Note: Section 46.)

Dates
- Royal assent: 8 April 2010
- Commencement: Various (Note: Section 47.)
Other legislation
Amends	Public Lending Right Act 1979; Video Recordings Act 1984; Copyright, Designs and Patents Act 1988; Broadcasting Act 1990; Communications Act 2003; Wireless Telegraphy Act 2006
Amended by	Public Bodies (Abolition of the Registrar of Public Lending Right) Order 2013; Copyright and Rights in Performances (Research, Education, Libraries and Archives) Regulations 2014; Deregulation Act 2015; Legal Aid, Sentencing and Punishment of Offenders Act 2012 (Fines on Summary Conviction) Regulations 2015; Digital Economy Act 2017; Media Act 2024
Relates to	Communications Act 2003; Copyright, Designs and Patents Act 1988; Video Recordings Act 1984

Status: Amended

Text of statute as originally enacted

Revised text of statute as amended

The Digital Economy Act 2010 (c. 24) is an act of the Parliament of the United Kingdom. The act addresses media policy issues related to digital media, including copyright infringement, Internet domain names, Channel 4 media content, local radio and video games. Introduced to Parliament by Peter Mandelson on 20 November 2009, it received royal assent on 8 April 2010. It came into force two months later, with some exceptions: several sections – 5, 6, 7, 15, 16(1)and 30 to 32 – came into force immediately, whilst others required a statutory instrument before they would come into force. However some provisions have never come into force since the required statutory instruments were never passed by Parliament and considered to be "shelved" by 2014, and other sections were repealed.

== Provisions ==
=== Online infringement of copyright provisions (sections 3–16) ===
Sections 3 to 16 contained copyright infringement provisions, which were controversial. These provisions established a "code" to be created which would define a system of procedures covering notifications to Internet service providers to notify their customers when an allegation was made of downloading copyright-infringing content online, subscriber appeals, conditions under which subscribers could be identified to third parties, and conditions for disconnecting persistent infringers. The objective was to provide evidence that copyright holders could use in court action against subscribers who repeatedly infringed. A second element of the provisions comprises the ‘technical measures’, where a sanction would be applied directly via a subscriber's Internet provider.

Under section 3 the allegations were to be transmitted to the Internet service providers (ISPs) by the copyright holders. The ISPs would then be obliged to transmit notifications to their subscribers, informing them of the allegation. Section 4 mandated the ISPs to keep a list of repeat offenders (a "copyright infringement list") who had reached a pre-determined threshold in terms of the number of infringements committed, and the data should be anonymous. The aim is that copyright holders could later seek a court order to identify subscribers against whom they want to take action.

==== Code not passed into law ====
The act provided for this in the form of an Enabling Act, which required Ofcom (the communications regulator for the UK) to produce a draft code that would then be passed by Parliament and come into force as a statutory instrument. However, by 2013, when the draft code was produced, the political climate had changed and a substantial controversy existed over the practicalities of the proposed code. The draft code was never passed into law or pursued after that date, and was "shelved" by 2014.

==== Outline of code provisions ====
The code had comprised the following components:

Initial obligations code

The act does not specify the implementation detail for the measures. Instead, it provides for the implementation to be drafted by Ofcom, in an Initial Obligations Code. Section 5 and Section 6 establish the process for Ofcom to write the code. Section 7 establishes in a very broad way what the code should contain, but leaves all the detail for Ofcom. The code must be approved by Parliament under the annulment procedure before it can come into force.

The decision to use the code of practice instead of specifying the measures in full within the text of the act has itself formed part of the controversy surrounding the measures. For example, the act did not specify the standard of evidence required. It also did not specify the threshold – number of infringements – for entry onto the copyright infringement list.

On 28 May 2010 Ofcom published a draft initial obligations code for consultation. In June 2012, it issued a second consultation document.

Obligations to limit Internet access (technical measures)

After the Initial Obligations Code has been in force for one year, the act provides for a second set of measures to be brought in. The technical measures specified in the act Section 9 are the restriction or limitation of the speed of the broadband connection, restricting access to particular material online, and suspension (disconnection) of the service. The most controversial of them however, was disconnection of the subscriber for a period of time. It would function as an alternative to taking people to court, and in effect an extrajudicial process.

Technical measures are to be brought in under another code, known as the code about obligations to limit Internet access Section 11 and Section 12. This code would be subject to the super-affirmative procedure in the British Parliament.

Appeals

Section 13 of the act requires the provision of an independent appeals process, so that subscribers who wish to do so, may challenge a notification or (when implemented) a technical measure. Ofcom is required to set up an appeals body. This body will be an administrative body, independent of copyright holders and ISPs. Cases will not be heard in person. If technical measures are implemented, there will be a right to appeal to a First Tier Tribunal.

Obligations on ISPs and copyright holders

The act amends the Communications Act 2003. In this context, it places obligations on the ISP to apply both of the codes, and it gives Ofcom the responsibility of enforcing those obligations. Ofcom has the power to fine the ISPs up to £250,000 if they fail to meet those obligations. Section 14.

The act also provides for the cost allocation to be determined by a further statutory instrument. Section 15. To date, two draft statutory instruments have been laid before Parliament but neither has been passed into law.

=== Blocking Internet locations (sections 17–18) ===
Section 17 and 18 would have allowed copyright holders to apply to a court to obtain website blocking injunctions where "a substantial amount of material has been, is being or is likely to be made available in infringement of copyright", or where a location "facilitates" such behaviour.

In deciding whether to grant an injunction, the court would have been required to consider:

- Steps taken by the operator of the location to prevent infringement
- Steps taken by the copyright owner to facilitate lawful access to the material
- Any representations made by a minister of the Crown
- Whether the injunction would be likely to have a disproportionate effect on any person's legitimate interests
- The importance of freedom of expression

Sections 17 and 18 would have had to be brought into force by a statutory instrument. However, following a review by Ofcom, they were repealed on the basis that copyright holders already had the ability to use section 97 of the Copyright, Designs and Patents Act 1988 to take court action against websites.

=== Other provisions ===
Other provisions in the act include

- Section 42 an amendment to the Copyright, Designs and Patents Act 1988 to increase the penalty in connection with criminal liability for copyright and performing rights to a maximum of £50,000.
- Age classification of content is also in the act, which adopts the Pan European Game Information (PEGI) standard for video game ratings, and transferring content rating from the British Board of Film Classification to the Video Standards Council.
- Changes to DAB radio in the United Kingdom including the reorganisation and merging of some of the local DAB ensembles and a requirement for a digital switchover of terrestrial radio in the United Kingdom.
- The management of .uk Internet domain registries.
- The functions of the Channel Four Television Corporation.
- The regulation of television and radio services.
- The regulation of the use of the electromagnetic spectrum.
- The Video Recordings Act 1984.
- Public lending right in relation to electronic publications. Authors receive a 10p royalty for physical books lent from UK libraries but not ebooks. This act extends that royalty to cover some ebooks and audio books lent by libraries electronically. However the appropriate legislation has not yet been amended for this to take place.

== Legislative process ==
The Digital Economy Act 2010 followed the Digital Britain report of 2009, a policy document which outlined the United Kingdom Government's strategic vision for its digital economy. Lord Carter, Digital Britain minister, spent eight months considering the matter before releasing his final report in June 2009. The Digital Economy Bill was announced in the Queen's Speech on 18 November 2009 to the United Kingdom Parliament. The bill went through three readings in the House of Lords, before being presented to the House of Commons for its first reading on 16 March 2010.

=== Wash-up ===
The general election was called on 6 April 2010, which meant that the Digital Economy Bill was running out of parliamentary time, as Parliament was dissolved on 8 April. The Digital Economy Bill went into what is called wash-up. The wash-up is an accelerated parliamentary process used after general elections have been called to rush unopposed legislation through parliament before dissolution. This meant it was not debated at length in the Commons. In return for supporting the Digital Economy Bill in the final wash-up vote the Conservatives demanded the removal of clause 43 which related to orphan works, copyrighted works for which the copyright owner cannot be located, which had been criticised by photographers. Other clauses that were removed during wash-up included provisions for the funding of regional news consortia. The bill received its second reading in the House of Commons on 6 April 2010.

There was support for the bill from both the governing Labour party and the opposition Conservatives. It passed its third reading on 7 April, with royal assent granted on 8 April. The act is in force, however the requirements for the sections relating to online piracy (ss.3–18) to have legal effect were never implemented.

== Initial controversies arising from the proposed act ==
=== Controversial aspects ===
Aspects of the proposed act which were strongly criticised included:

- The Digital Economy Bill incorporated a graduated response policy despite the alleged file sharer not necessarily having to be convicted of copyright offences. The bill also introduced fines of up to £50,000 for criminal offences relating to copyright infringement – for example if music is downloaded with intent to sell. The high penalty is considered to be proportionate to the harm caused to UK industries. An appeals process exists whereby the accused can contest the case however, the concern has been expressed that this process will be costly and that, in requiring the individual to prove their innocence, the bill reverses the core principles of natural justice.
- Critics saw serious repercussions and perceived the concepts as ill-considered and likely to prove "disastrous". While the British Phonographic Institute claimed the bill was vital for the future of creative works in the UK. The Conservative party spokesman for Culture and Media stated that those downloading should be given a criminal record. Conversely, the Liberal Democrat party spokesman for Culture and Media claimed the bill was reckless and dangerous stating that children could unwittingly be file sharing, causing an entire family to lose their internet connection. In addition to this, there was concern that hackers may access internet connections to download files and leave the bill payer responsible.
- Providers of public Wi-Fi access is uncertain. Responsibility for breaches could be passed on to the provider due to the difficulty in identifying individual users. The Internet provider therefore may risk losing Internet access or facing a hefty fine if an infringement of copyright takes place. Many libraries and small cafés for example may find this impossible to adhere to as it would require detailed logging of all those requiring internet access. In libraries in particular this may provide challenges to the profession’s importance of user privacy and could force changes in future policies such as acceptable use policies (AUP). Public libraries utilise AUPs in order to protect creative works from copyright infringement and themselves from possible legal liability. However, unless the AUP is accompanied by the provision of knowledge on how to obey laws it could be seen as unethical, as blame for any breaches is passed to the user.
- The hospitality sector considered that it would be badly affected by the act. The British Hospitality Association has stated that hotels would have particular problems in providing details of guest’s Internet access to Internet service providers and entire hotels may face disconnection. They have also expressed their concern that an individual's actions may lead to such a drastic outcome.
- Internet service providers were also hostile towards the bill. TalkTalk stated that suspending access to the Internet breached human rights. This view may be shared by many, as a survey carried out by the BBC found that 87% of internet users felt internet access should be the "fundamental right of all people". Certainly, people require access to the internet for many aspects of their life for example shopping, online banking, education, work and even socialising. Furthermore, TalkTalk Director of Regulation, Andrew Heaney has acknowledged that file sharing is a problem but the answer is to educate people and create legal alternatives. Heaney has also argued that disconnected offenders will simply create other user names to hide their identity and continue downloading. TalkTalk has claimed that 80% of youngsters would continue to download regardless of the bill and that internet service providers are being forced to police this without any workable outcomes.
- Cable company Virgin Media also criticized the Digital Economy Bill believing it to be heavy handed and likely to alienate customers. Virgin advocated the development of alternative services which people would choose instead of file sharing.

There was also a high level of public activism and protest against the act, in many forms. The Guardian reported that hundreds were expected to march outside the House of Commons on 24 March 2010. Moreover, an estimated 12,000 people sent emails to their MPs, through the citizen advocacy organization 38 Degrees. 38 Degrees objected to the speed with which the bill was rushed through Parliament, without proper debate, due to the imminent dissolution of parliament prior to a general election. In October 2009 TalkTalk launched its Don't Disconnect Us campaign asking people to sign a petition against the proposal to cut off the internet connections of those accused of unauthorized file sharing. By November 2009 the petition had almost 17,000 signatories and by December had reached over 30,000. The Pirate Party in the UK called for non-commercial file sharing to be legalized. Formed in 2009 and intending to enter candidates in the 2010 UK general election, the Pirate Party advocates reform to copyright and patent laws and a reduction in government surveillance.

=== Opposition to the bill ===
The provisions relating to copyright infringement and especially technical measures were highly controversial and were criticised by digital rights campaigners. The Open Rights Group, a privacy and digital rights organisation, took their concerns to the House of Lords. Concerns were raised about the impact on businesses offering Internet access to their customers, such as libraries and universities. Jim Killock, executive director of the Open Rights Group, called the bill "an utter disgrace. This is an attack on everyone's right to communicate, work and gain an education". He said that "politicians have shown themselves to be incompetent and completely out of touch with an entire generation's values".

38 Degrees, who worked with the Open Rights Group to mobilise opposition to the act, state that over 22,000 people have emailed their MPs through their web site. 38 Degrees raised over £20,000 in donations to fund newspaper advertisements against the bill. More than 35,000 people signed a Number 10 petition, started by Andrew Heaney at ISP TalkTalk, objecting to being disconnected without fair trial. Over 100 people protested outside Parliament on 24 March 2010, including Labour MPs Tom Watson and John Grogan, Liberal Democrat prospective parliamentary candidate Bridget Fox, and writer and activist Cory Doctorow.

TalkTalk, Britain's second-largest ISP, has been a vociferous critic of the act. They opposed it from its earliest stages by staging media events, declaring that they would fight against the new laws in court, and commissioning research to demonstrate that music fans would simply transition to other, non-P2P tools (such as "applications which scan thousands of internet radio stations and download the desired tracks"). TalkTalk have also argued that the requirement in Ofcom's draft code of conduct that only ISPs with 400,000 customers or more would initially be subject to the act "could [lead to] huge swathes of customers moving to smaller ISPs to avoid detection". BT said that they felt compelled to act "for our customers who otherwise run the risk of being treated unfairly".

The Pirate Party UK were strongly opposed to it. The Green Party, whose Members of the European Parliament (MEPs) sit with the two Swedish Pirate Party MEPs in the same group, opposed the bill. "The Digital Economy Bill is deeply flawed and illiberal...Any Green MPs will provide a rallying point for opposition to the Digital Economy Bill." The Liberal Democrats opposed the parts that relate to the blocking of people's Internet connections. These parts were later dropped by the Conservative and Liberal Democrat coalition government (see below).

=== Industry lobbying ===
The Secretary of State Peter Mandelson was widely believed to be responsible for the copyright infringement provisions that would see the disconnection of Internet subscribers. The Independent reported that according their Whitehall sources Mandelson was persuaded that tough law were needed to reduce online copyright infringement following an intensive lobbying campaign by influential people in the music and film industry.

It was also reported that there had been a meeting with DreamWorks co-founder David Geffen at the Rothschild family villa on the Greek island of Corfu. Mandelson's spokesperson claimed that there had been no discussion of internet piracy during the Corfu dinner and suggested that the decision to reverse Lord Carter's findings had been taken in late July before the trip. The Times reported after the Corfu meeting that an unnamed Whitehall source had confirmed that before this trip, Mandelson had shown little personal interest in the Digital Britain agenda, which has been ongoing for several years. According to The Times, Mandelson returned from holiday and effectively issued an edict that the regulation needs to be tougher. At the time Mandelson denied that the two events were linked.

In August 2011 a Freedom of Information (FOI) request showed that Mandelson had decided to approve the inclusion of technical measures, such as the disconnection of Internet access, some time before public consultation had finished. Letters from Mandelson's office document talks with Lucian Grainge, CEO of Universal Music Group on 2 July 2009, and that on the following day Mandelson advised Lord Carter about the "possibility of [the Secretary of State] having a power to direct Ofcom to go directly to introduce technical measures". The government made an announcement that disconnection, was being considered for inclusion in the Digital Economy Bill on 25 August 2009.

=== Support for the bill ===
The Design and Artists Copyright Society and the British Association of Picture Libraries and Agencies support the orphan works provision. The Community Media Association supports the act for the radio clauses stated to bring significant benefits to the community broadcasting sector as FM spectrum becomes available following digital radio switchover. Attitudes of Internet service providers (ISPs) towards the copyright infringement provisions in the bill were mixed. In interviews with ISPs by TechRadar, Virgin Media said that they shared the commitment to address copyright infringement, but that persuasion not coercion is the key; a heavy-handed, punitive regime would simply alienate Internet users. Sky, which is both an ISP and a content provider, was supportive of the government's commitment to underpin the fight against illegal file sharing through legislation, but not directly of the "website banning" proposal.

=== Ofcom review of sections 17 and 18 ===
Following calls by citizens to repeal all or part of the Digital Economy Act 2010 on the Your Freedom website, the government asked Ofcom in February 2011 to review whether sections 17 and 18 of the act on website blocking are technically workable.

Following the review by Ofcom, the government announced on 3 August 2011, that sections 17 and 18 of the act were to be dropped as they were not practically enforceable, and also as the Copyright, Designs and Patents Act 1988 had been successfully used to block access to a website on the grounds of copyright infringement.

=== Cost of implementation ===
In response to a Freedom of Information (FOI) request Ofcom disclosed that it had spent £1.8 million in the 2011/12 financial year on the implementation of the online copyright infringement provisions, section 3 to 16 of the Digital Economy Act 2010, and the site blocking provisions, section 17 and 18. Ofcom planned to spend another £4.0 million in 2012/13. These figures include £100,000 spent on reviewing the technical workability of section 17 and 18, a review commissioned by the government in February 2011. According to Ofcom the Digital Economy Act 2010 provided that Internet service providers and copyright owners bear the cost of section 3 to 16, including the cost to Ofcom and an appeals body. They are also liable to pay Ofcom's cost incurred prior to actual implementation. However, Ofcom notes that the April 2011 ruling by the High Court on the judicial review of the online copyright infringement provisions provides that Internet service providers are not liable to pay towards Ofcom' cost or that of an appeals body.

== Post-legislative legal inquiries into the act ==
=== Judicial review ===
On 8 July 2010 TalkTalk were joined by BT, Britain's biggest ISP, in seeking a judicial review of the act on the grounds of it receiving "insufficient scrutiny" and having the potential to "harm citizens and impact both businesses". They questioned whether the provisions were proportionate, respected privacy law, complied with EU law on ISP liability, and suggested that they would hinder a single European market in telecommunications services.

The High Court of Justice granted the review permission on 10 November 2010. Mr Justice Kenneth Parker ruled in favour of the government on 20 April 2011. BT and TalkTalk appealed the ruling, however their appeal was dismissed.

=== Select committee inquiry ===
On 10 November 2010, the same day as the judicial review, the Culture, Media and Sport Committee of Parliament announced an inquiry into the act. The inquiry was asked to consider "the implementation, practicality and likely effectiveness of the relevant measures contained in the act", and "the scope for additional and new approaches to ensure that original work is appropriately rewarded in online".

== Digital Economy Act 2017 ==
This legislation was updated by the Digital Economy Act 2017, which updates the anti-infringement provisions of existing laws, creates or updates criminal copyright breach provisions, and provides for a wider range of sentencing for criminal infringement.

== Academic analysis and reference sources ==
- Andersen, B (2010)Shackling the digital economy means less for everyone: the impact on the music industry in Prometheus: Critical Studies in Innovation Volume 28, Issue 4, 2010
- Barron, A (2011) Graduated Response A l'Anglaise: online copyright infringement and the Digital Economy Act 2010
- Cammaerts, B and Meng, B (2011) Creative Destruction and Copyright Protection:Regulatory Responses to File-sharing Archived 30 May 2012 at the Wayback Machine
- Dutton, W Aiming at copyright infringers and hitting the digital economy in Prometheus Vol. 28, No. 4, December 2010, 385–388
- Giblin, R (2013) Evaluating Graduated Response
- Horten, M (2013) A Copyright Masquerade: How Corporate Lobbying Threatens Online Freedoms Archived 6 August 2013 at the Wayback Machine ZedBooks.
- Romero-Moreno, F (2013) Unblocking the Digital Economy Act 2010; human rights issues in the UK in International Review of Law, Computers & Technology, 21 March 2013
- Romero-Moreno, F (2014) Incompatibility of the Digital Economy Act 2010 subscriber appeal process provisions with Article 6 of the ECHR in International Review of Law, Computers & Technology, 10 January 2014
- Romero-Moreno, F (2016) The Digital Economy Act 2010: subscriber monitoring and the right to privacy under Article 8 of the ECHR in International Review of Law, Computers & Technology, 26 April 2016

== See also ==
- British Phonographic Industry (BPI)
- International Federation of the Phonographic Industry (IFPI)

=== Related international law ===
- Copyright law of the European Union
- DADVSI & HADOPI law (France)
- Digital Millennium Copyright Act (United States)
- Ley Sinde (Spain)
- Telecoms Package (European Union)
