= Ley Sinde =

Spanish legal provision addressing internet copywrite infringement

Ángeles González-Sinde
- Long title: Sustainable Economy Act
- Territorial extent: Spain
- Enacted by: Ángeles González-Sinde
- Enacted: December 30, 2011

Summary
- The Sinde Law, part of the larger Sustainable Economy Act, is Spanish legislation designed to reduce internet copyright infringements.

Ley Sinde (English: Sinde Law) is a provision in Spain's Sustainable Economy Act designed to address internet copyright infringements. The bill passed the final legislative hurdle and was made law Friday December 30, 2011. The law created a new intellectual property commission designed to review requests from copyright holders about websites that they claim infringe upon their copyright. The commission has the authority to determine whether to take action against the website or content intermediaries such as the internet service provider (ISP) or hosting provider. The commission's ruling is evaluated by a judge, with the goal of completing the entire review process within 10 days. The law has a provision that also requires content intermediaries to respond more quickly than under previous law: websites determined to be in violation of copyright law must be taken down within 48 hours. Finally, the law has a significant impact on individual privacy rights: it allows impacted parties to seek the identity of those they believe to have infringed on their copyright. This clause reversed precedent set by a 2008 European Court of Justice’s ruling in Promusicae v. Telefónica barring IP holders from demanding the identity of copyright infringers from ISPs. There was strong international pressure, predominantly from the United States, for the creation of this legislation while it was strongly opposed by bloggers, journalists and tech professionals in Spain. Deputy Prime Minister Soraya Sáenz de Santamaría said that the aim of the law was "to safeguard intellectual property, boost our culture industries and protect the rights of owners, creators and others in the face of the lucrative plundering of illegal downloading sites."

== Legislative history ==
The United States government has used the Special 301 Report to encourage other countries into adopting more stringent copyright and patent laws. Leaked cables suggest US pressure was a major factor in the creation of Ley Sinde. In February 2008 the US Embassy in Spain sent a cable back to Washington indicating they planned to tell the Spanish government that they would appear on the Watch List of the Special 301 Report if they did not take significant steps to reduce internet copyright infringements. The cable indicated that they would encourage the Spanish government to adopt a law similar to the two proposals that would eventually become France's HADOPI Law and the UK's Digital Economy Act 2010. The Spanish government did not show sufficient progress to satisfy the Office of the United States Trade Representative, and it was added to the 301 Special Report in 2008 and 2009.

In November 2009 the Spanish government proposed a new copy protection law, the Sustainable Economy Bill, in order to address many copyright infringement issues across the nation. This bill included a provision, backed the Culture Minister at the time Ángeles González-Sinde, that would eventually become what is known today as the Sinde Law. This provision of this bill led to significant protests by the Spanish public and it was eventually stripped from the Bill on December 21, 2010, by The Committee of Economy and Finance in Spain's Congress as it engaged all users to agree. With the failure of this provision, Spain was again added to the 301 Special Report in 2010.

After being stripped from the Sustainable Economy Bill, politicians worked to revise Ley Sinde into a form that would be able to obtain passage through both the Congress and the Senate. Though still controversial, on January 25, 2011, the Senate passed this revised version of the law. Congress followed suit and passed the revised version of the law on February 15, 2011. This was the last step required before the regulations detailed in the law could be developed and the commission to review infringement claims established. The law received 323 votes in favor with 19 against and one abstention. Work continued on implementing the law over the course of 2011, though political struggles within the government led by President José Luis Rodríguez Zapatero derailed final enforcement of the bill. (In Spain executive power is held by the government which is considered separate from the legislative power vested in the two chambers of parliament. See Politics of Spain for more information) Due primarily to issues related to the 2008 financial crisis, a new government was elected to replace that of President Zapatero. The Council of Ministers within the Zapatero government failed to reach an agreement to enact the Sinde Law in March 2011 and were unable to reach an agreement before leaving office on December 2, 2011. The United States, as discovered in the release of another leaked cable, raised the stakes considerably for the incoming Spanish government indicating that if the Sinde Law was not enforced Spain would be placed on the Priority Watch List in the upcoming Special 301 Report. On Friday December 30, 2011 the newly elected government approved the final regulation needed to put Ley Sinde into place.

== Copyright infringements in Spain ==
Spain is considered by many to be the worst offender in Western Europe when it comes to internet copyright infringements. In 2010, 10 million CDs were sold as compared to 71 million in 2001, and digital sales have not replaced the lost CD sales. An executive at EMI Europe has been quoted as saying, "You can have a number-one album in Spain with 3,000 sales." Since 2008, Spain has been placed on the US Special 301 Report Watch List, a list compiled by the Office of the United States Trade Representative. The watch list identifies countries that the US feels do not have sufficient protection for copyright. The 2011 version of the report lists three Western European countries on the Watch List: Italy, Greece, and Spain.

A study conducted by International Data Corporation (IDC) and commissioned by the Madrid-based Coalition of Content Creators and Industries, a group of copyright holders, examined the impact of copyright infringements in the first six months of 2010 on the Spanish economy. IDC claimed that 97.8% of all music consumption in Spain was from illegal downloads. During this same time period 77% of movie downloads and 60.7% of game downloads also took place illegally. IDC estimated this came at a cost of €5.2bn ($6.8bn USD, £4.3bn).

== Protests ==
Ley Sinde continues to face strong opposition among the Spanish public as of February 2012. Nine days after the first draft of the Sustainable Economy Act, a group of journalists, bloggers, professionals and creators drafted an anti-Sinde manifesto which was re-published by more than 50,000 blogs and websites. FACUA-Consumers in Action, a Spanish, non-profit, non-governmental organization, also launched an anti-Sinde campaign under the slogan: "nonprofit exchange of cultural works has always been a socially and morally accepted practice". FACUA gathered more than 40,000 signatures from their campaign. There have been several protests regarding the law, including a few organized by the loose collective known as Anonymous. One of the most publicized protests occurred at the Goya Awards (Spain's equivalent of the Academy Awards) in February 2011. Several hundred people, loosely organized by the Internet group Anonymous, showed up at the red carpet event wearing Guy Fawkes masks and called for the resignation of Ángeles González-Sinde. Just after Ley Sinde was enacted in December 2011, individuals claiming affiliation with Anonymous also published private information about Spaniards thought to have supported the law. This included personal details like cell phone numbers, addresses, and, in the case of the González-Sinde, pictures of the front of her house. Individuals identified by the post reported receiving harassing phone calls and, in one instance, a death threat. With this release of personal information, the group also announced that further attacks would be upcoming at the 2012 Goya Awards. This threat was carried out in both real and cyber-space. Anonymous hackers took down the web page for the Goya awards on the day of the event. At the same time, three individuals wearing Guy Fawkes masks sneaked through several layers of security and rushed onto the stage as awards for best director were being announced.

== See also ==
- Graduated response
- SOPA and PROTECT IP Act (United States)
- Digital Millennium Copyright Act (United States)
- EU Copyright Directive (European Union)
- DADVSI & HADOPI law (France)
- Digital Economy Act 2010 (UK)
- Telecoms Package (European Union)
