= HADOPI law =

French IP and Internet privacy law

The French HADOPI law (French: Haute Autorité pour la Diffusion des Œuvres et la Protection des droits d'auteur sur Internet, (Note: Pronounced: pronounced [ot‿ɔtɔʁite puʁ la difyzjɔ̃ dɛz‿œvʁ e la pʁɔtɛksjɔ̃ de dʁwa d‿otœʁ syʁ ɛ̃tɛʁnɛt]) English: "Supreme Authority for the Distribution of Works and Protection of Copyright on the Internet") or Creation and Internet law (French: la loi Création et Internet) was introduced during 2009, providing what is known as a graduated response as a means to encourage compliance with copyright laws. HADOPI is the acronym of the government agency created to administer it.

The part of the HADOPI law that allowed for suspension of Internet access to a repeat infringer was revoked on 8 July 2013 by the French government because that penalty was considered to be disproportionate. The power to impose fines or other sanctions on repeat infringers remains in effect.

In January 2022, the Hadopi agency merged with the High Audiovisual Council (CSA), to form the Regulatory Authority for Audiovisual and Digital Communication (Autorité de régulation de la communication audiovisuelle et numérique; ARCOM).

== Legislative passage ==
Despite strong backing from President Nicolas Sarkozy, the bill was rejected by the French National Assembly on 9 April 2009. The French government asked for reconsideration of the bill by the French National Assembly and it was adopted on 12 May 2009 by the assembly, and on 13 May 2009 by the French Senate.

Debate included accusations of dubious tactics made against the promoters of the bill. There were complaints that the government's official website misrepresented the bill, that the French Wikipedia pages on it were falsified by the Ministry of Culture on 14 February 2009. and a "petition of 10,000 artists" in support of the bill was questioned as allegedly fraudulent.

=== Timeline ===
- The bill was presented to the French Senate by the government on 18 June 2008.
- On 23 October 2008, the government shortened the debate by making the bill a matter of urgency, meaning it could be read only once in each chamber, under art. 45 of the French constitution.
- The bill was adopted by the Senate on 30 October 2008.
- The bill was presented to the Assembly on 11 March 2009, where it was amended and the amended version adopted on 2 April 2009.
- Since the two legislative chambers had now adopted different versions, a parliamentary commission (seven members of the Senate and seven members of the Assembly) was constituted on 7 April 2009, mandated to produce a common text to be voted on by both chambers without further debate.
- The resultant bill was unanimously adopted by the Senate on 9 April 2009. On the same day, it was defeated in the Assembly (21–15), a consequence of absenteeism on the part of French socialist party MPs who later explained themselves in an open letter to the newspaper Libération. published on 27 April 2009; coauthored by Jean-Marc Ayrault, Patrick Bloche, François Brottes, Corinne Erhel, Michel Françaix, Jean-Louis Gagnaire, Didier Mathus, Sandrine Mazetier, Christian Paul
- The bill was re-presented to the National Assembly on 29 April when 499 amendments were moved, most of which were rejected
- The amended bill was adopted by the Assembly on 12 May 2009 (296–233). All present French socialist party members voted against it except Jack Lang.
- The Senate voted in favor of the bill on 13 May, (189–14), all senators of the socialist party abstaining, except Samia Ghali.
- On 17 May, members of the National Assembly contested the constitutionality of the law and submitted it to the Constitutional Council for examination.
- On 10 June, the Constitutional Council declared the main part of the bill unconstitutional, therefore making it useless. The council found that the law violated the 1789 Declaration of the Rights of Man and of the Citizen, and in particular presumption of innocence, separation of powers and freedom of speech.
- On 22 October 2009, the Constitutional Council approved a revised version of HADOPI, requiring judicial review before revoking a person's Internet access, but otherwise resembling the original requirements.

== Details of the law ==
=== Government agency ===
The law creates a government agency called Haute Autorité pour la Diffusion des Œuvres et la Protection des Droits sur Internet (HADOPI) (English: Supreme Authority for the Distribution and Protection of Intellectual Property on the Internet); replacing a previous agency, the ARMT (Regulation of Technical Measures Authority) created by the DADVSI law.

The new government agency is headed by a board of nine members, three appointed by the government, two by the legislative bodies, three by judicial bodies and one by the Conseil supérieur de la propriété littéraire et artistique (Superior Council of Artistic and Literary Property), a government council responsible to the French Ministry of Culture. The agency is vested with the power to police Internet users.

=== Mandate ===
To ensure that Internet subscribers "screen their Internet connections in order to prevent the exchange of copyrighted material without prior agreement from the copyright holders" (Art. L. 336-3 of the bill). HADOPI also retains mandates previously attributed to the ARMT.

=== Enforcement ===
On receipt of a complaint from a copyright holder or representative, HADOPI may initiate a 'three-strike' procedure:

- (1) An email message is sent to the offending Internet access subscriber, derived from the IP address involved in the claim. The email specifies the time of the claim but neither the object of the claim nor the identity of the claimant.

The ISP is then required to monitor the subject's Internet connection. In addition, the Internet access subscriber is invited to install a filter on his Internet connection.

If, in the 6 months following the first step, a repeat offense is suspected by the copyright holder, his representative, the ISP or HADOPI, the second step of the procedure is invoked.

- (2) A certified letter is sent to the offending Internet access subscriber with similar content to the originating email message.

In the event that the offender fails to comply during the year following the reception of the certified letter, and upon accusation of repeated offenses by the copyright holder, a representative, the ISP or HADOPI, the third step of the procedure is invoked.

- (3) The HADOPI can send the offender case to the court which can return a verdict of a maximum fine of 1500 euros. Until its abrogation in 2013, the court could add an additional sentence of suspending Internet access for one month maximum. By the law, it was impossible to suspend Internet access without, first, sentence the fine.

Offender can seek recourse against the HADOPI, before case transmission, and against the court.

The Internet access subscriber was blacklisted and other ISPs were prohibited from providing an Internet connection to the blacklisted subscriber. The service suspension did not, however, interrupt billing, and the offending subscriber was liable to meet any charges or costs resulting from the service termination.

According to the CNIL, action under the HADOPI law does not exclude separate prosecution under the French code of Intellectual Property, particularly its articles L331-1 or L335-2, or limit a claimant's other remedies at law.

==== Enforcement in practice ====
Since the law was approved in 2009 until abrogation of the suspension of access to a communication service in 2013, only one user has been sentenced to suspension (for 15 days) plus fined for EUR 600. The sentence never applied because of the abrogation some days after.

=== Abrogation of the suspension of access to a communication service ===
On 9 July 2013, the French Ministry of Culture published official decree No. 0157, removing from the law "the additional misdemeanor punishable by suspension of access to a communication service." allegedly because "the three strikes mechanism had failed to benefit authorized services as promised". The Minister explained that the stricter copyright policy of the French Government would be revised from going after the end-user to taking punitive sanctions against companies who provide web hosting and telecom infrastructure services which allow copyright infringement to occur. Nevertheless, the fines against users found to be sharing unauthorized content remained standing ("up to EUR 1500 in cases of gross negligence"), and ISPs are still required to provide details to identify them.

The French Culture Minister Aurélie Filippetti explained that the financial costs to the French Government in applying the Hadopi Law was not sound. She disclosed that it cost her Ministry 12 million Euros and 60 civil servants to send 1 million e-mails to copyright infringers and 99,000 registered letters, with only 134 cases examined for prosecution.

== Background ==
Implementation of the European Copyright Directive resulted in the French DADVSI law which has been in force since 2007, creating the crime of lack of screening of Internet connections in order to prevent exchange of copyrighted material without prior agreement from the copyright holders (art. L335.12). The DADVSI law did not prescribe any punishment. It has been partially invalidated by the Constitutional Council of France's rejection of the principle of escalation, and retains only the crime of copyright-infringement, punishable by up to 3 years' prison and a fine of up to €300,000.

The HADOPI law is supposed to address the concerns of the Constitutional Council of France, in addition to replacing the DADVSI law, which has yet to be enforced.

=== Olivennes report and Élysée agreement ===
On 5 September 2007, the French Minister of Culture, Christine Albanel asked the CEO of the major French entertainment retailer (Fnac), Denis Olivennes, to lead a task force to study a three-strike sanction, to conform with the ruling of the French Constitutional Council. After consulting representatives of the entertainment industry, Internet service providers and consumer associations, the Olivennes committee reported to the Minister on 23 November. The report was signed by 40 companies at the Élysée and presented as the "Olivennes agreement". It was later renamed the "Élysée agreement".

The HADOPI law is the implementation of the Olivennes report, supported by the Olivennes agreement, in which representatives of the entertainment and media industries gave their assent to the law's enforcement procedures. Nevertheless, some companies, notably the ISPs Orange and Free, later dissented from the agreement.

== Lobbying for the bill ==
Owing to its controversial nature, the bill became a subject of intense campaigning in various media, which was redoubled after its parliamentary defeat on 9 April 2009.

=== President Sarkozy's Brussels Intervention ===
On 4 October 2008, the then French President Nicolas Sarkozy, a personal supporter of the law, interceded with the president of the European Commission regarding an amendment to the EU Telecoms Package that targeted the HADOPI law and the lack of a judicial ruling in the original drafting of it. This was Amendment 138 to the Framework directive as adopted by the European Parliament in the First Reading of the Telecoms Package. The European Commission's response to Sarkozy was that it supported Amendment 138. That remained its position until the Telecoms Package was finally adopted with the so-called Freedom Provision (Directive 2009/140/EC, Article 1.3a).

=== Government ===
The French government created a promotional website in support of the country's entertainment industry. The content of the website was criticised as misleading. It was also alleged that French Wikipedia pages relative to HADOPI were edited by the Ministry of Culture on 14 February 2009.

=== Entertainment industry ===
SACEM and other entertainment industry players mounted a petition of "10,000 artists" in support of the HADOPI law. The list has been challenged on several grounds:

- Many signatories are said to be unconnected with artistic activities ascribed to them.
- Some signatories are bogus or fictitious, one example being "Paul Atreides".
- Some artists listed as signatories have denied that they support it.

== Lobbying against the bill ==
=== Consumer associations ===
The leading French consumer association UFC Que Choisir has positioned itself against the law and set up a website to support opposition.

Digital rights group La Quadrature du Net is a strong lobbyist against the law.

Following an open letter in the newspaper Libération signed by Chantal Akerman, Christophe Honoré, Jean-Pierre Limosin, Zina Modiano, Gaël Morel, Victoria Abril, Catherine Deneuve, Louis Garrel, Yann Gonzalez, Clotilde Hesme, Chiara Mastroianni, Agathe Berman and Paulo Branco which was published on 7 April 2009, and co-authored notably by Victoria Abril and Catherine Deneuve, an informal group has been constituted under the name Creation Public Internet.

On 12 March 2009, the British Featured Artists Coalition publicised its opposition to the principle of the HADOPI law.

== Political groups' positions ==
With the exception of the French Green Party who campaigned against the law, other political groups represented in the legislative chambers were not active lobbying for or against the law, though individual members did so. The French Socialist Party was probably the most divided. While it initially favored the law (voted yes in the Senate's first reading), it was chiefly responsible for the surprise rejection of the bill after the first reading in the National Assembly, as well as requesting the Constitutional Council's ruling. The Pirate Party (France) although not represented in the legislative chambers also campaigned against the law.

== Logo incident ==
Shortly after HADOPI's agency logo was presented to the public by Minister of Culture and Communication Frédéric Mitterrand, it was revealed that the logo used an unlicensed font. The font was created by typeface designer Jean François Porchez, and is owned by France Télécom. The design agency that drew the logo, Plan Créatif, admitted to using the font by mistake and the logo was redone with another font.

== See also ==
- Regulatory Authority for Audiovisual and Digital Communication
- Graduated response
- Copyright aspects of downloading and streaming
- Music download
- Ley Sinde
- Telecoms Package
