= Third Strike =

Third Strike may refer to:

- A strikeout in baseball
- 3rd Strike (band), a rap rock group
- Third Strike (album), a 2010 album by Tinchy Stryder
- Street Fighter III: 3rd Strike, a 1999 video game

== See also ==
- Three strikes law in US legal system
- Three strikes (disambiguation)
