= DADVSI =

French bill concerning copyright law

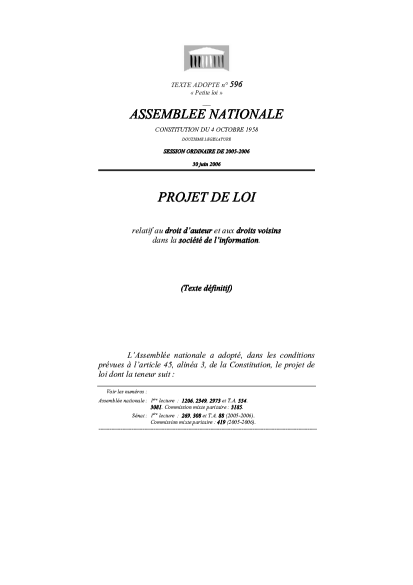
First page of the bill as finally adopted by both houses of Parliament

Loi DADVSI (generally pronounced as [dadsi]) is the abbreviation of the French Loi relative au droit d'auteur et aux droits voisins dans la société de l'information (in English: "law on authors' rights and related rights in the information society"). It is a bill reforming French copyright law, mostly in order to implement the 2001 Information Society Directive, which in turn implements a 1996 WIPO treaty.

The law, despite being initially dismissed as highly technical and of no concern to the average person, generated considerable controversy when it was examined by the French Parliament between December 2005 and June 30, 2006, when it was finally voted through by both houses.

Most of the bill focussed on the exchange of copyrighted works over peer-to-peer networks and the criminalizing of the circumvention of digital rights management (DRM) protection measures. Other sections dealt with other matters related to copyright, including rights on resale of works of art, copyright for works produced by government employees and exceptions to copyright for education and the handicapped, among other issues.

The law was controversial within France because of fears that it could significantly hamper free software and might also significantly restrict the right to make copies of copyrighted works for private use.

Some amendments to the bill, not present in the original version, would potentially require manufacturers to share their proprietary digital music formats with other software developers (by way of the need to provide the documentation necessary for interoperability). Because of this, a controversy arose with Apple Computer and associated US industry groups, who loudly protested in the US press; therefore, the DADVSI bill was sometimes referred to as the iTunes law or iPod law in the English-language press (see Interoperability and Apple controversy), although the law is not referred to in this way in France.

== Legal background ==
The title of the DADVSI law refers to droit d'auteur et droits voisins (authors' rights and related rights). Authors' rights, in French law, have two components:

- economic rights (droits patrimoniaux): the exclusive right of the author of a work of the mind to reveal this work according to his or her conditions (that is, for instance, by ceding this right to a publisher);
- moral rights (droits moraux), such as: the right for the author to obtain redress against others claiming to be the author of the work; these rights cannot be ceded.

This concept is reflected in the Berne Convention on Copyright. Copyright is a related concept, but pertains to Anglo-American common law; one notable difference is that copyright does not generally involve moral rights.

The legal clauses governing authors' rights and related rights form the first book of the French Code of Intellectual Property (CPI). This article will thus refer to articles from this code as CPI Lnnn.

The notion of 'author' extends to that of composer (of music), playwright, painter, photographer, etc., though the law makes it a requirement that the work should be original (or show some supplemental originality, in the case of a derived work) in order to be protected. In practice authors often cede their rights to publishers, who then enforce the "exclusive right" and some are members of societies that enforce their rights on their behalf. The latter is de facto nearly compulsory in case of songwriters and composers, almost all of whom are members of Sacem.

Performers and publishers of audio recordings enjoy "related rights". These follow different rules and have a shorter duration than the rights of authors. In practice performers often cede their rights to publishers, or have them enforced by societies.

The exclusive right of the author is not absolute. According to WIPO treaties, local legislation may make exceptions to exclusive copyrights only if these exceptions fulfill a "three-step test": limitations and exceptions

- should only concern special cases;
- should not conflict with a normal exploitation of the work;
- should not unreasonably prejudice the legitimate interests of the right holder.

This is how the US doctrine of fair use is justified with respect to copyright treaties for instance. The 2001 European Directive on Copyright proposes a list of 10 exceptions to copyright that member states can choose to implement or not, in addition to one whose implementation is compulsory (this makes an exception for temporary technical copies, meant to address Web caches and similar systems).

Exceptions to copyright in French law are defined in CPI L122-5. Among them is the notable exception for private copies: French residents may freely make copies of works (except software) for their private use, and freely display those works within their family circle (which is interpreted to include friends), without the agreement of the copyright holder. However, French law includes a "tax on private copies" meant to address the losses incurred by copyright holders; this tax is levied on blank media (audio and video cassettes, CD's, DVD's, as well as memory and hard drives in portable media players). Normally taxation is reserved for legislation, a prerogative of the French Parliament, but a statute endowed an ad hoc commission to set the rates and conditions for this tax.

European directives are generally not directly enforceable in EU member states. They first have to be transposed into local law, generally by an act of the legislature of the member state. While they give a general framework and impose some options they may leave significant leeway: in the case of EUCD, for instance, the directive gives a list of optional copyright exceptions, and mandates appropriate legal protection for DRMs, without defining what constitutes an appropriate protection. Member states have to transpose directives within reasonable delays, or they face action by the European Commission. There may be subsequent litigation before the European Court of Justice if subsequent the implementation is deemed to be inadequate.

In March 2006, the Cour de cassation, France's highest court in civil and criminal matters, ruled in a decision nicknamed Mulholland Drive (from the name of a DVD involved). It quashed a decision by the appeals court of Versailles that ruled that Digital rights management techniques that contradicted the "right to private copy" were illegal. Legal scholars noted the following:

- the manner in which the decision was presented indicated that it was a decision meant to establish doctrine (following the civil law tradition, French courts are theoretically prohibited from judging in the general case so as to establish case law, but in practice the Cour de cassation does so in certain decisions).
- the decision cited the "test in three steps" and the yet untransposed European directive on copyright as source of doctrine, whereas, some legal scholars argue, it is up to the legislature to decide how to apply such principles when making law, not to the courts.

In response an amendment was added to the DADVSI law by the National Assembly, which established a "right to the exception for private copy." However, the scope of this right is unclear, since it was to be decided by a "college of mediators", but it was suppressed from the final text of the law.

The crux of the discussion on private copy is the nature of this so-called "right". One can interpret it weakly, as an exception to the general possibility for copyright holders to prevent any unauthorized distribution of their work, or strongly, as a prohibition for copyright holders to use technical means to prevent private legal copies.

The "three-step test" was also copied into article "1 bis" of the draft law, which updates CPI L122-5. See Copyright exceptions.

== Politics ==
The DADVSI law unexpectedly rose as a somewhat well-publicized topic in national French politics in December 2005 with the vote of the so-called "global license". Two major presidential candidates personally intervened in the controversy while others made declarations.

=== Legislative process ===
The initial draft of the law was proposed in 2003 by then Minister of Culture Jean-Jacques Aillagon (Union for a Popular Movement, UMP). Because of various circumstances, including the replacement of Aillagon by Renaud Donnedieu de Vabres (UMP), the bill was presented very late to the French Parliament and was initially to be examined in the National Assembly on December 20, 21 and 22, 2005 just before the Christmas holidays. The government (the cabinet of ministers, as represented by the Minister of Culture) had declared the law to be urgent, which means, under the Constitution of France, that the law would be examined only once by each house of Parliament; the reason given by the minister was that France was threatened by the European Commission with sanctions if it failed to implement the directive.

Despite being initially presented as a technical text the law became hotly controversial. It became perceived as criminalising Internet users for sending files of copyrighted works to each other, as well as being a threat to free software. It was also feared that it would mean, in practice, the end to the right of creating a "private copy": for instance, making a copy of a record onto digital magnetic tape for the private use of the owner of the record, which is currently authorized by CPI L122-5.

The examination of the draft law by the National Assembly, initially seen as a quick matter preceding the Christmas break, was marred by several incidents, the best known being the vote on the first amendment of the "global license" (see below). Supplemental sittings of the Assembly had to be allotted in March in order for the law to be fully examined. An important factor was that the schedule of full sittings of the Assembly or the Senate is almost entirely decided by the executive.

Prior to the examination of the law by the assembly in session, the draft bill had been sent to the Commission of Law, without any review by the Commission of Cultural Affairs, as would have been expected of a text presented by the Minister of Culture pertaining to artistic works; this procedure was deplored by some deputies. Deputy Christian Vanneste was commissioned to report on the law.

Deputies from the opposition (French Socialist Party, PS, French Communist Party, PCF, Greens) as well as the junior majority coalition partner Union for French Democracy (UDF) expressed their opposition to such a highly complex law being rushed through Parliament. On December 21 they supported a motion sending the draft law back for examination in parliamentary commission. However, the Minister of Culture opposed the move stating that he hoped that the "solid parliamentarians from UMP" would not vote for the motion — a move interpreted as a quasi-order to the deputies from his party not to vote for the motion.

An amended draft law was approved by the National Assembly on March 21, 2006, by 296 votes for, 193 against. The UMP (right-wing), which has the absolute majority at the National Assembly, voted in favour, while the left voted against it. MPs of the center-right UDF voted either against the text or abstained.

The Senate sent the bill before the Commission of Cultural Affairs who commissioned Senator Michel Thollière to report on it. The Commission heard Minister de Vabres on April 4 and recommended a number of amendments. The Senate then examined the law in session on May 4, 9 and 10, 2006, and adopted a number of amendments.

There was still considerable uncertainty on the future of the bill. Prime Minister Dominique de Villepin had the choice between letting the text go back before the National Assembly, then before the Senate for another round of examination or maintaining that the text was urgent and sending it before a mixed commission from both houses of the French Parliament to draft a compromise version to be sent to both houses to be voted upon, with the Assembly being able to have a final say. Minister of Culture Donnedieu de Vabres had promised that he would have the law sent for another reading by both houses if the differences between the texts adopted by the Assembly and the Senate were too great. He contended that those differences between the texts were small enough that the text could be sent before a mixed commission; however, some members of Parliament disagreed. The bill was rumored to be scheduled to be examined by the mixed commission on May 30, but in the end it was not.

On June 15, 2006, despite the request by 20 UMP deputies that the text should be sent to the National Assembly again, the government announced that it would send the bill before the mixed commission on June 22. The text will then be sent before both houses for final approval.

On June 22, in the morning, the mixed commission met. However, the Socialist members soon quit, claiming that the commission was a parody of democracy after discovering during the meeting 55 amendments hardening the Senate text.

Both houses of Parliament finally approved the bill on June 30, the last day of the Parliamentary session. UMP voted in favour, the Communists and Socialists against, and UDF split over it between those voting against and those abstaining from voting. Socialist deputy Patrick Bloche defended a motion of inadmissibility, claiming that the law was unconstitutional and thus that the Assembly had to refuse it; Communist deputies and president of the UDF François Bayrou announced that they supported the motion. The motion was voted down, predictably, because the UMP ruling party had an absolute majority in the Assembly.

On July 7, 2006, the Socialist deputies, 3 Green deputies, 4 Communist deputies, 2 UDF deputies (François Bayrou, president of UDF, and Hervé Morin, head of the UDF group in the Assembly) filed a recourse before the Constitutional Council. This recourse blocked the signing of the law: the council has one month to decide on the constitutionality of the law except if the Government claims urgency, in which case it has eight days. The recourse included the following claims of lack of constitutionality, based on the Declaration of the Rights of Man and of the Citizen:

- the clarity and sincerity of the legislative process were jeopardized by
  - the government withdrawing article 1 after amendments that it disapproved were voted down;
  - the mixed parliamentary commission significantly introducing amendments that were neither in the Assembly nor in the Senate text;
- a number of clauses of the law that infringed on the rights of citizens:
  - the definition of some crimes being unclear, whereas citizens should be able to understand what is a crime and what is not:
    - exceptions to copyright were restricted by the Berne three-step test in a vague manner. These were now part of French law but ordinary citizens could only guess how to interpret this test, though copyright infringement was a crime;
    - computer programs "manifestly designed for spreading copyrighted works" were criminalized, but no definition was given as to what this means, and the exceptions to this prohibition were also vaguely defined, thus citizens could not know whether such and such program was illegal or not;
    - the voted text of the law admits "interoperability" as a valid goal for exemption from the prohibition of circumvention of DRM protection measures, but, unlike earlier drafts, did not define the word;
  - no guarantee was given as to the modes of proof and investigation of the crimes defined in the law.

After the decision of the Constitutional Council the law was submitted to President Jacques Chirac for signature on August 1, 2006.

=== Political importance ===
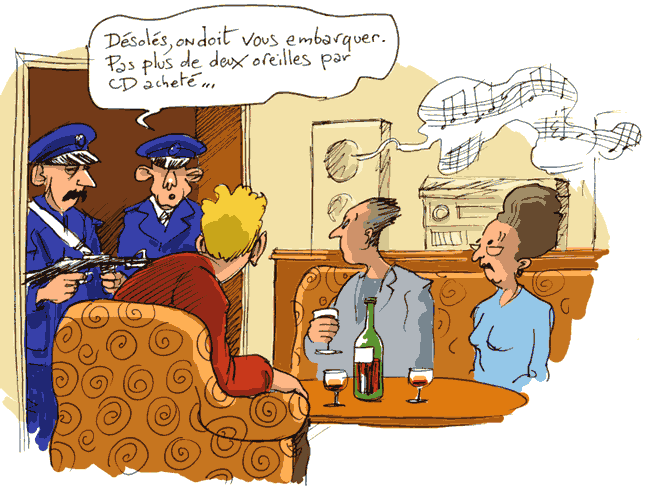
"Sorry, we have to take you away. No more than two ears for each CD bought..."

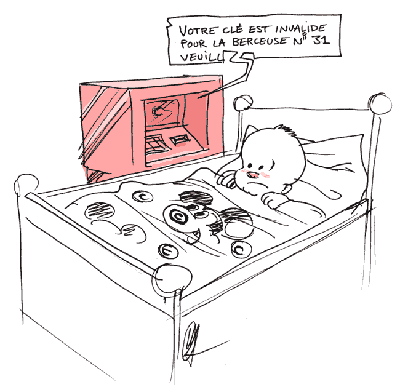
"Your DRM key is invalid for lullaby #31"

At first sight, the DADVSI law was not meant to be a disputed legal text: it dealt with fairly technical legal points. It was, however, turned into a political hot topic featured in major newspapers and on national television.

The first draft of the DADVSI law criminalized peer-to-peer exchanges of copyrighted works (or, more precisely, copyrighted works whose licenses did not allow such exchanges). The case was made in Parliament that millions of French Internet users, especially among the young, currently traded files on computer networks and that it was thus unrealistic to turn them into felons. Since subsequent reading coincided with the examination of a controversial youth workforce clause known as the CPE, the opposition argued that the government was at war with the youth.

The DADVSI law was used as a platform for various groups or parties for demonstrating opposition to the government policies:

- Deputies for the opposition French Socialist Party supported an alternative scheme known as the "global license", despite the party's divisions on the issue. They denounced the government as repressive, especially against the younger population.
- François Bayrou, president of the center-right party Union for French Democracy (UDF), formerly inside the ruling coalition, used the opportunity to distance itself from the policies of the Union for a Popular Movement (UMP) ruling party. He denounced the parliamentary process that produced the law, which, he claimed, was forced through Parliament under the influence of the executive and lobbies.
- Nicolas Dupont-Aignan, a eurosceptic member of the UMP majority party, distanced himself from the policies of the government and opposed an "unenforceable law".
- Christine Boutin, a member of the UMP majority party and former presidential candidate (2002 French presidential election), with a political platform oriented towards "family values", claimed that it was absurd to turn millions of young people (and possibly, 'some parliamentarians') into criminals.

=== Lobbying ===
Some members of the French parliament, as well as other observers, publicly decried the intense lobbying by various groups and industries. Bernard Carayon, UMP deputy for the Tarn département, denounced lobbying, pressures and even blackmail on the part of certain groups on national TV. A number of parliamentarians said they had never seen such intense lobbying from all sides, including a grassroot effort from Internet users and free software advocates which inundated them with letters and emails. At one point, Senator Michel Charasse demanded that parliamentary staff clean out corridors of loitering lobbyists.

Alain Suguenot, a supporter of the global license, UMP deputy for the Côte-d'Or département, hinted that some groups or societies supporting events had threatened to withdraw their support for events in the constituencies of deputies voting in favour of the global license. Suguenot, who is also mayor of the town of Beaune, indicated that his town would no longer support a cinema festival and would replace it by something related to computing and Internet technologies.

Minister of Culture Renaud Donnedieu de Vabres was criticized for being too close to some industry groups.

- At the beginning of the DADVSI discussion in December, Donnedieu de Vabres organised a demonstration of commercial music download platforms inside a room of the National Assembly, where deputies were given a free account with a €10 credit. Opposition deputy Christian Paul denounced this action and the demonstration was shut by president of the Assembly Jean-Louis Debré, who indicated that though he had authorized the demonstration he had not authorized it to go in this manner.
- According to the Odebi league, a pressure group defending French Internet users, some aides of Donnedieu de Vabres had strong links to industry groups. In response, some, such as Pascal Rogard from SACD, denounced the League as a specialist in ad hominem attacks.

Some amendments to the law (150/151, 267) were labeled by some parliamentarians and others as the "Vivendi Universal amendments", because they were allegedly inspired by the entertainment giant. The free software advocate group EUCD.info denounced the fact that the lobbyist for an industry group was allowed into the "four column hall", a room in the Assembly building whose access is normally restricted to deputies and journalists.

=== Confusion ===
Minister Donnedieu de Vabres was criticized by parliamentarians for lack of preparation. For instance, François Bayrou, head of the center-right UDF party, criticised how the minister submitted a last minute pair of amendments of seven pages completely changing the criminal penalty system applicable to illegal copies of copyrighted material, and for creating a de facto "police of the Internet". He pointed out that modifications of such an importance should be examined in commission.

On January 3, 2006, in his yearly speech of wishes addressed to the President of the Republic, president of the National Assembly Jean-Louis Debré (UMP) denounced the usage by the government of the procedure of urgency, which he claimed was used excessively often. He also denounced how the government frequently sent hastily redacted draft laws to Parliament then had to send amendments in order to correct its own texts. Specifically mentioning DADVSI he deplored how the government had sent two four-page amendments in the middle of the examination of the text, alluding to the same amendments that Bayrou had denounced.

In its March 15, 2006, edition, the Canard Enchaîné investigative weekly reported that Debré had complained that Donnedieu de Vabres was "a zero, who put us in the shit and, from the start, dragged us into an adventure".

=== Protests and Internet actions ===
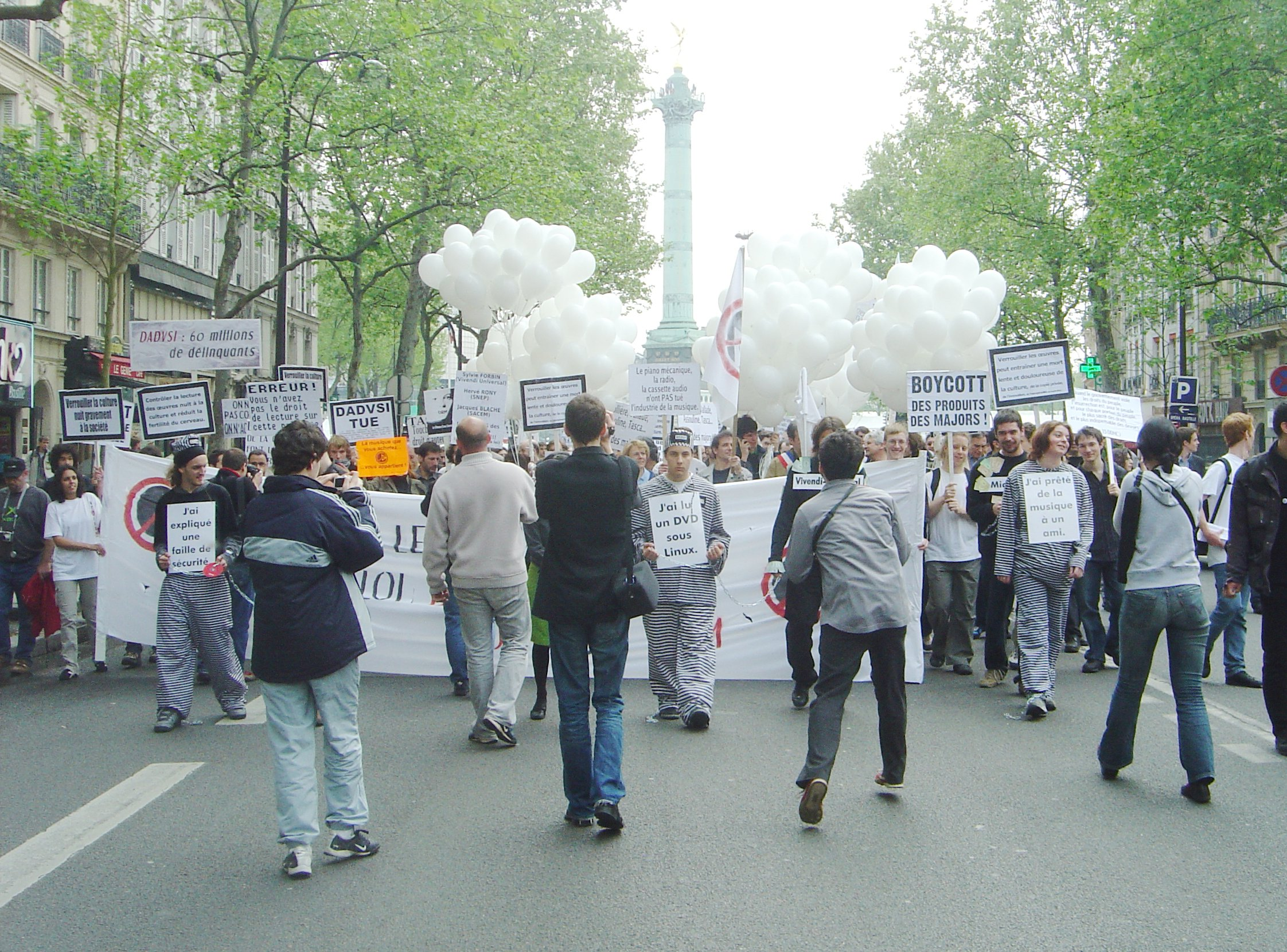
May 7, 2006, march

The EUCD.info group ran an Internet petition, which, by June 2006, garnered more than 170,000 signatures.

Groups opposed to clauses in the law organised a variety of protests. The StopDRM group organised flash mobs. Various groups organized a march against new French copyright law on May 7, 2006, as the bill was at the Senate; the March ended with flowers being laid in memory of authors' rights.

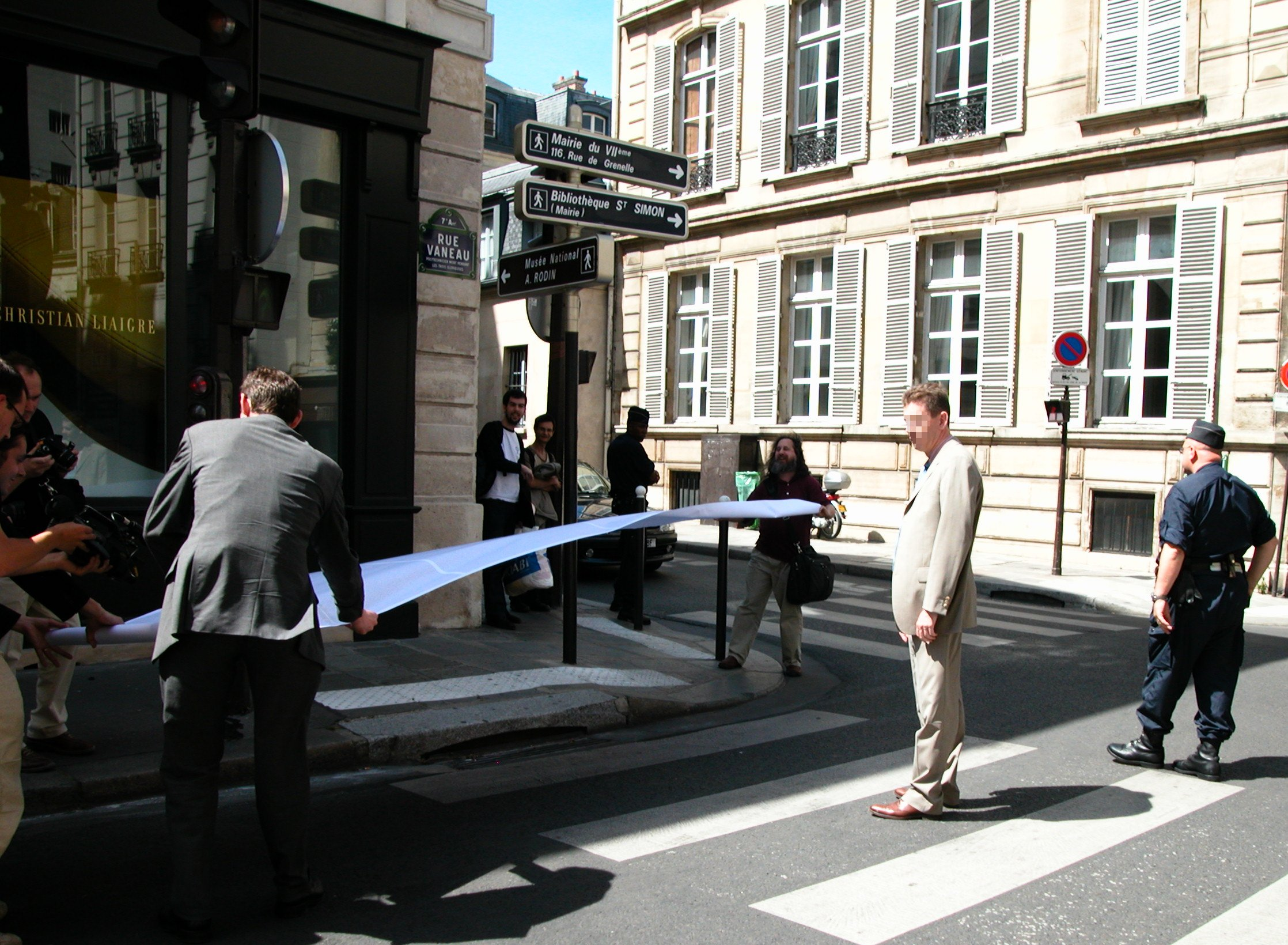
Unrolling of the signature list near the offices of the French Prime Minister

On June 9, 2006, a delegation including Richard M. Stallman, president of the Free Software Foundation, went to the Hotel Matignon to meet prime minister Dominique de Villepin, however, the prime minister and his advisors refused to meet them. The delegation protested the fact that they were turned away while business leaders such as Bill Gates from Microsoft got official reception. They laid down the list of 165,000 signatories of the EUCD.info petition in the gutter, as a sign of what they saw as contempt for the concerns of ordinary citizens.

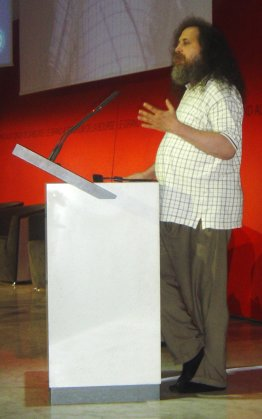
Richard Stallman speaking against DADVSI at Paris, capitale du libre

On June 26, Stallman spoke against DADVSI at a free software business meeting organized by the City of Paris (Paris, capitale du Libre); on June 28, he met presidential candidate Ségolène Royal.

The Odebi league campaigned against politicians who they claim supported the positions of the "major" record corporations. A campaign of Google bombing was made against Minister Donnedieu de Vabres: searching Google for ministre (minister) or blanchisseur (launderer) resulted in a news article about the conviction of Donnedieu de Vabres for money laundering.

== Repression of Internet copying of copyrighted works ==
The DADVSI law contains a number of articles meant to suppress the copying of copyrighted music or videos through peer-to-peer networks over the Internet.

The initial version of the bill punished most acts related to illegal copying of copyrighted material, including working around anti-copy systems, as a felony counterfeiting, with a maximum sentence of 3 years in prison and/or a €300,000 fine. However, a number of parliamentarians contended that this was equivalent to criminalizing millions of Internet users, especially the young, and Minister Donnedieu de Vabres immediately introduced amendments known as "escalation": peer-to-peer users who copy files illegally would first be warned, then fined, with stronger penalties for repeat offenders.

Finally, the choice was made to criminalize authors and publishers of software capable of unlocking copy protection system or copying copyrighted works over the Internet, while users would receive much softer penalties.

=== Sharing of copyrighted works over peer-to-peer networks ===
In the current state of the law, CPI L335-2 and L335-5 punish as counterfeiting the act of publishing copyrighted works without the authorization of the rights holders, with a maximum sentence of 3 years in prison and/or a €300,000 fine.

Whether or not sharing files over a peer-to-peer network falls within the scope of this prohibition has been controversial. Some groups, such as the Audionautes, have contended that the act of receiving copyrighted works from Internet sites or peer-to-peer networks is an act of private copying, which is a valid exemption from copyright rules, following from CPI L122-5. Courts have ruled in both directions, some convicting peer-to-peer users, others acquitting them.

Article 14 bis of the DADVSI law explicitly exempts from this regime the act of downloading a copyrighted work on a peer-to-peer network. This exemption is further extended to the act of making some copyrighted work available to the public without any commercial purpose, when this is an automatic result of the use of a peer-to-peer network for obtaining it; this clause was added because many peer-to-peer networks automatically make downloaded content available to other users, thus merely exempting downloads from the counterfeiting felony would not have been sufficient.

These acts, exempted from the counterfeiting felony charge, would still fall under a lesser charge, with a fine to be defined by a decree (executive decision). Minister Donnedieu de Vabres has announced a €38 fine for downloading acts, but it is yet unknown whether this would apply to any single file (thus a person with 1000 songs downloaded illegally could in theory owe a fine of €38,000) or whether several downloads could be punished with a single fine.

Supporters of the global licence such as Patrick Bloche have pointed out that fines would go into the state budget and would thus not benefit artists financially.

=== The "global license" ===
In 2005, an alternative proposal to the original draft law was proposed. Instead of criminalising peer-to-peer file sharing, the proposal would have made peer-to-peer exchanges legal, in exchange for a fee on broadband Internet subscriptions. The fee would go have gone to fund the artists and authors. This is known as the "global license" or "legal license".

The "legal license" was promoted by the alliance public-artistes ("public / artists alliance"), composed of:

- consumers' associations (UFC Que Choisir and others)
- Internet users associations (Association des audionautes...)
- family associations
- musical performer rights societies (ADAMI, SPEDIDAM)
- musical performer associations
- other artists' associations.

It was backed by a number of politicians, both on the left (members of the French Socialist Party such as Patrick Bloche and Christian Paul) and on the right (members of the UMP such as Christine Boutin and Alain Suguenot), who defended it in the National Assembly. It was defended in the National Assembly, but not the Senate, by parliamentarians from the French Socialist Party, the Greens, and the French Communist Party.

No specific amount of fee was discussed in the law, but it was meant to be approximately €7 per month for a broadband connection. French broadband connections typically cost €30 a month for rates up to 16 megabits per second, digital TV and unlimited VoIP phone calls.

Proponents of the law contended that:

- The global license is a realistic measure in the long run. Internet users will use peer-to-peer networks anyway and there are already millions of peer-to-peer users so it's unreasonable to claim that they will be prosecuted. Instead of trying to revert this trend it would be better to tax it.
- The alternative to this is heavy-handed enforcement and intrusive Digital rights management (DRMs).
- The global license would provide a steady stream of revenue to authors and artists.

Opponents contended that:

- The global license is a communist measure, while DRMs allow fine-grained, individual, remuneration of artists.
- There is no reliable method for apportioning the money raised through this method to artists. If polling methods are used, they may miss smaller artists.
- The global license is contrary to the "test in three steps" that must be verified by every exception to copyright.
- The global license would fail to provide enough revenue to authors and artists.

In the evening sitting of the Assembly on December 21, the first of the series of amendments establishing the global license (identical amendments 153 as proposed by UMP deputy Alain Suguenot and 154 as proposed by deputies from the French Socialist Party) was voted by a 30-to-28 margin, much to the dismay of Culture Minister Donnedieu de Vabres. This was the first time that a legislature anywhere had supported an alternative compensation system to broadly legalize P2P file sharing.

The global license proved difficult to handle for the government. It was initially thought that the minister would request another examination of the controversial amendment by the Assembly; however, the head of the UMP group in the assembly, Bernard Accoyer, stated that the French Parliament had demonstrated that it was not a chambre d'enregistrement (a chamber for registering the wishes of the executive) and pointed out that the text was only at the beginning of its examination by Parliament, which has two houses, which seemed to suggest that he expected the amendment to be struck down in the Senate.

The examination of the text by the National Assembly resumed in March. The Minister of Culture announced that the government would use its prerogative to withdraw its own draft law in order to withdraw article 1 of the law, which was the article to which amendments 153/154 applied, and propose in its stead a "1 bis" article. This move was supported by President of the National Assembly Jean-Louis Debré, who exceptionally presided the sitting; Debré cited precedent for such actions to deputies questioning the constitutionality of the action. However, the next day, the government announced that it would not withdraw the article, following from a communication by president of the Constitutional Council Pierre Mazeaud that the move's constitutionality was unclear. The Assembly then proceeded with the remaining amendments to article 1, then, expectedly, voted down article 1, then examined article "1 bis". The "global license" was thus removed from the text, and did not make it into the final version of the law that was put into place.

However, an Internet access provider named 9 Telecom did implement a similar idea, by providing unlimited downloadable music, protected by DRM, from the Universal catalog to its subscribers; without legal problems as 9 Telecom belongs to Universal.

=== Criminalisation of DRM circumvention ===
Articles 13 and 14 of the law introduced a variety of criminal penalties for those working around DRM technical measures:

- A fine up to €3,750 is applicable for those who knowingly work around a DRM technical measure for reasons other than research, if this is not done using means procured from others.
- Prison sentences up to 6 months and/or fines up to €30,000 are applicable for those who supply others with means to work around technical measures, or who knowingly propose such means.
- Lesser fines will be subsequently introduced by an executive decree.

However, none of these penalties apply when the purpose of circumvention was computer security or research. This last clause, exempting circumvention from penalties when it is done for certain purposes, was kept by a narrow 11–10 margin in the Senate.

=== Interoperability and Apple controversy ===
The DADVSI law grants legal protection to digital rights management "technical protection methods" (defined in article 7); that is, it contains clauses criminalizing circumvention of DRMs (articles 13 and 14).

The initial draft law was heavily criticized for the vagueness and wide scope of the anti-circumvention clauses. It was feared that:

- These clauses could potentially outlaw any free software capable of reading DRM-using formats (music, video, or even text content); the fear was that free software implementing DRM would be construed as facilitating circumvention. Designers of software knowingly facilitating circumvention would, with the initial draft, face felony charges of counterfeiting with a maximum penalty of a €300,000 fine and/or three years in prison. Free software advocates thus concluded that the law would have a chilling effect on the development of free software in France, since any modern desktop system is supposed to be able to read music and video content, and their designers could not be sure whether they would face felony charges.
- These clauses would allow designers of DRM systems to have competitors prosecuted by claiming that these competitors' systems facilitated circumvention of DRMs. This would, in effect, create a new kind of intellectual property in addition to copyright and patents. However the purpose of the law was to protect the copyright of composers, artists, film-makers etc. and not grant new legal protections to DRM companies.
- These clauses would tie people to the provider of the music, since the DRM system of a music provider would only work with the players from this provider. This would in turn be an annoyance to customers, since content from one device would not be playable on another.
- The clauses would prevent investigation of possible security lapses in DRM systems, such as when Sony's Extended Copy Protection system was found to create computer security problems.

Since the personal computing software industry in France is heavily dominated by a few companies (such as Microsoft and Apple Computer), which also provide DRM systems, it was feared that the law would reinforce these dominant positions and prevent competition from free software. Politicians across all French political parties have declared free software to be important for France, since it provides competition in a field dominated by extra-European corporations. It is officially considered instrumental in controlling the IT expenses of public administrations.

Accordingly, a number of free software organizations (Free Software Foundation France, EUCD.info, Framasoft, APRIL, AFUL...) lobbied that the DADVSI law should not act as a de facto prohibition on making free software capable of reading formats protected by DRMs, including video and music, and thus making free operating systems unsuitable for personal use. They also noted that copyrighted works also include text, that formats such as PDF also have DRMs, and thus that the law could well exclude free software from desktop processing, since it could perhaps not read the same file formats as the main desktop suites.

Those associations argued that criminal law should not reinforce network effects and the practice of tying sales (vente liée), that is, making it compulsory to buy one good or service to be able to buy another good of service, without a legitimate motive, which is prohibited by French law (Consumption code, L122-1). They argued that music and electronic equipment capable of playing it are separate products and that the sale of one should not be tied to that of the other.

Politicians from several parties (among whom Alain Carayon and Richard Cazenave from the ruling right-wing UMP, François Bayrou, president of the center-right UDF) pushed amendments aimed at ensuring interoperability of DRM systems. These amendments were adopted by the Assembly at the very end of its reading of the law, on the night of March 16 to March 17.

These amendments stated that:

- Providers of DRM systems should provide the necessary technical documentation to any party needing it to ensure that interoperability. In practice, this would mean that makers of software or hardware players could request information from providers of DRM-protected music or video in order for that music or video to be playable on their systems.
- The publication of the source code or technical documentation of systems implementing DRMs is not prohibited by the protection granted to DRMs.

It is unclear, though, whether these clauses would apply to DRM providers who not choose to avail themselves of the specific legal protection that the law grants to DRMs. That is, it is unknown at this point whether a licence agreement clause claiming that no part of a system, format or protocol is deemed to implement a DRM could exempt DRM providers from having to provide interoperability information.

These clauses proved controversial, mostly in the US press, where analyses provided by various interest groups claimed that they were directed at Apple's iTunes platform and their iPod players; some news sources even went as far as to nickname the DADVSI law the "French iTunes law". Some analysts claimed that they could force Apple to shut down iTunes for French customers, because Apple's business model ties iTunes content to the iPod player using the DRM system and the French market comprises a relatively small portion of Apple's overall sales. Apple claimed that the French copyright law amounted to "state-sponsored piracy". According to Apple, the proposed legislation would increase copyright piracy by making it easier for copyright pirates to download songs from iTunes in a generic format and then endlessly copy them for other users (the iTunes format, being proprietary, is more difficult to transfer to other media).

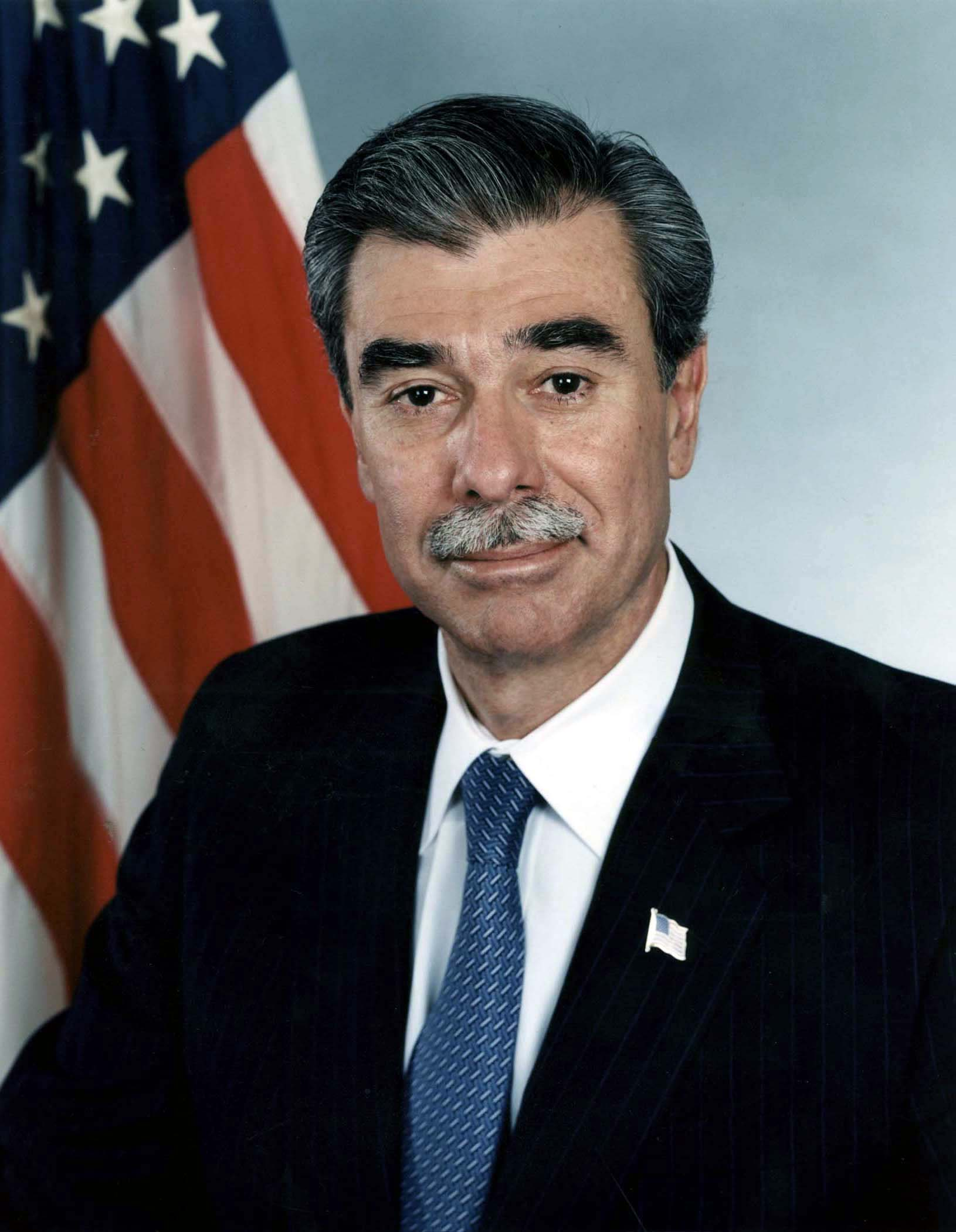
US Secretary of Commerce declared that he would look into the French law.

This declaration supported the claims by free-software advocates and politicians who said that the protection of DRM initially envisioned would benefit makers of DRM systems by enabling them to prosecute competitors as facilitating piracy. Finally, US Secretary of Commerce Carlos Gutierrez declared that it would look at the law closely and support intellectual property rights, a comment widely interpreted to be supportive of Apple.

The reaction from Apple and the US government was highly controversial in France. The Odebi league, a citizen's action group defending the rights of Internet users, told Apple to "mind its business and not meddle into the French legislative process" and pointed out that "if Apple wishes to do business in France, it has to respect the rights that the French enjoy"; the league also issued a communiqué titled Guterriez go home. Deputy Christian Paul published a communiqué meant to explain the intents of French lawmakers to Americans, without the media filtering. Christian Paul criticized the French government for making so much effort to please Apple:

When Apple coughs, we now know that Paris sneezes [...] Apple has assured itself control over channels of distribution and sales by imposing a proprietary format.

Representatives from Apple were heard by the Senate Commission for Cultural affairs. The Commission subsequently recommended that the interoperability provisions should be substantially reworked, and proposed amendments, most of which were adopted by the Senate. A notable exception is that the Senate rejected (by 11 votes against 10) an amendment from the Commission which suppressed the right to work around DRMs for reasons of interoperability. The text from the Senate introduces an administrative authority capable of adjudicating the possibility of reading DRM contents in order to achieve interoperability.

Article 7 bis A introduced a loophole for designers of technical measures of protection who do not desire to share them for interoperability. It states that the mission of this administrative authority is to prevent lack of interoperability and other limitations when these are not desired by the copyright holder. It thus seems possible that designers of technical measures can work around the interoperability requirement by showing that lack of interoperability was desired by the copyright holders.

=== The "Vivendi Universal" amendments ===
Some amendments, adopted by both houses of Parliament, introduce civil and criminal responsibility for authors of software used for illicit copying of protected works. These amendments are widely known as the "Vivendi Universal" or "VU" amendments; that terminology was used by some members of Parliament, the reason for it being that, allegedly, these amendments were strongly pushed by Vivendi Universal, a major entertainment corporation. According to the Odebi League and EUCD.info, these amendments were unofficially supported by president of the ruling UMP party and presidential candidate Nicolas Sarkozy. They ended up making up articles 12 bis and 14 quarter of the text adopted by the Senate.

Article 12 bis introduced criminal penalties (up to 3 years in prison and/or a fine of up to €300,000) for people who knowingly make available software "manifestly" meant to transmit copyrighted works illegally, or who knowingly incite to the use of such software. A number of commentators doubt the constitutionality of this article, because of the uncertainty introduced by the word "manifestly" for defining an incrimination; they also contend that this article amounts to making authors of software criminally responsible for the actions of others (users) that they do not control.

Article 14 quarter made it possible for right holders to obtain court injunctions ordering makers of software mainly used for illegal transmissions of copyrighted works to implement whatever technical measures that can prevent this usage, as long as they do not change the nature of the software. A register of copyrighted works is made available in order to help in the effective implementation of those measures. This article could make it mandatory to implement technologies such as SNOCAP into peer-to-peer transmission programs, as proposed by Sylvie Forbin from Vivendi Universal.

A related amendment, making up article 14 ter A, mandated that Internet users should "secure" their Internet connection so that it is not used for transmitting copyrighted works illegally; Internet service providers are supposed to provide users with the suitable technology. This measure may be targeted at peer-to-peer users claiming that their WiFi connection was hijacked, but it may also result in forcing all users to install anti-virus and filtering software on their machines.

== Copyright exceptions ==
Droit d'auteur (the Author's rights) is an exclusive right of the author. However, there exist in French law a number of legal exceptions to this exclusive right, somewhat similar to the US notion of fair use. These are listed in CPI L122-5, and article 1/1 bis of the DADVSI law alters these exceptions.

The law first expands the exceptions:

- It introduces an exception for education, starting from January 1, 2009: it allows the representation or the reproduction of short works or extracts of works not meant for commercial use if the following conditions are meant:
  - these are used solely for purposes of illustration of analysis within education and research, excluding all recreational activity
  - the public is strictly restricted to a majority of pupils, students, teaching and research staff directly concerned
  - no commercial use is made
  - a negotiated remuneration compensates these uses for copyright holders.
- It explicitly allows for transitory and technical reproductions, e.g. web caches.
- It allows specialized facilities for the handicapped to freely reproduce and represent works, e.g. by making audio recordings, Braille versions. The electronic files used for such works may be deposited at an administration for safekeeping.
- It allows public libraries, museums and archives to freely reproduce works for purposes of conservation or preservation of onsite consultation.
- It allows the information press to freely show a reproduction of a work of art (sculpture, painting, architecture...)
  - for purposes of immediate information,
  - if the work of art is directly in relation with the information
  - provided that the author is clearly identified
  - excluding works that themselves aim at reporting information (so a newspaper cannot claim to be able to copy freely press photographs)
  - within reasonable bounds (number of illustration, format).

However, article 1/1 bis also introduces the Berne three-step test directly into French law:

The exceptions enumerated within this article cannot hamper the normal exploitation of the work, neither can they cause an undue loss to the legitimate interests of the author.

This clause is highly controversial. Members of the opposition such as Patrick Bloche have argued that the Berne three-step test may be imposed onto states, so that their legislation conforms to the test, but not onto individual citizens. They argue that the vagueness of this test makes it impossible for citizens to know what is allowed and what is disallowed, whereas counterfeiting of copyright works may be a felony offense, and thus that the law is unconstitutional because it is unintelligible. (In December 2005, the Constitutional Council of France declared clauses in a tax bill to be unconstitutional because they were unintelligible. )

A notable exception has been raised by the General Prosecutor of Paris, who allowed bank FINAMA (part of the French insurer GROUPAMA) to scupper a $200 million software piracy trial for the sake of bank secrecy.

In France, the Cour de Cassation and an Appeal Court have dismissed a €520 million software piracy case, ruling that U.S. Copyright certificates were not providing any protection and that software sold by its author during a decade in more than 140 countries does not deserve the "originality" criteria because it was "banal", prior art in the market segment being already available.

In the light of this judicial decision, the jurisprudence is unclear as there is little software able to claim being the first of its kind.

== Other contents of the law ==
The main focus of the law is DRMs and repression of peer-to-peer usage, but some other issues related to copyright were also included:

- Title II of the law clarifies the copyright regime over works of employees of the State or local governments;
- Title III toughens regulations over societies collecting money on behalf of copyright holders, and creates some tax credit for record companies;
- Title IV changes procedures for the "legal deposit" of works;
- Title V changes certain rules pertaining to the resale of works of art and remuneration of the artist, known as droit de suite.

== Notable individuals and groups ==
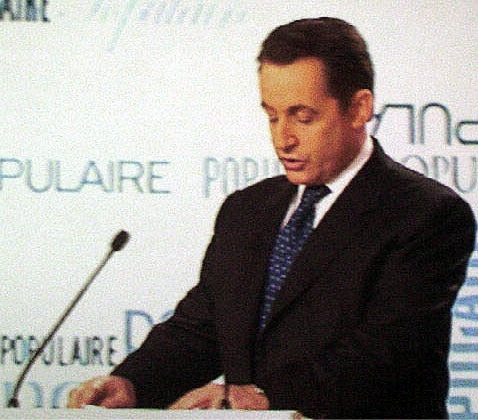
Nicolas Sarkozy, president of UMP (centre-right)

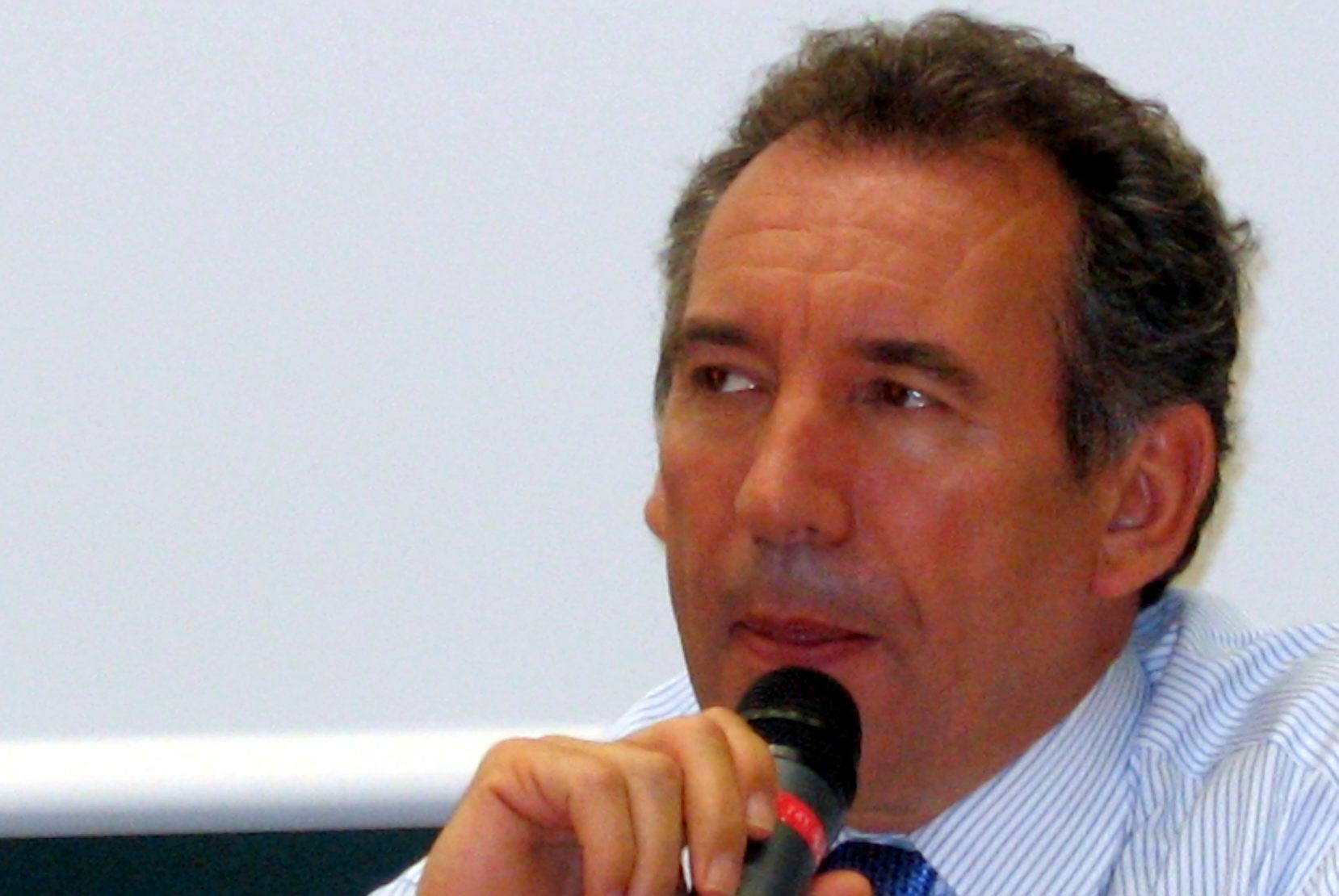
François Bayrou, president of UDF (centrist)

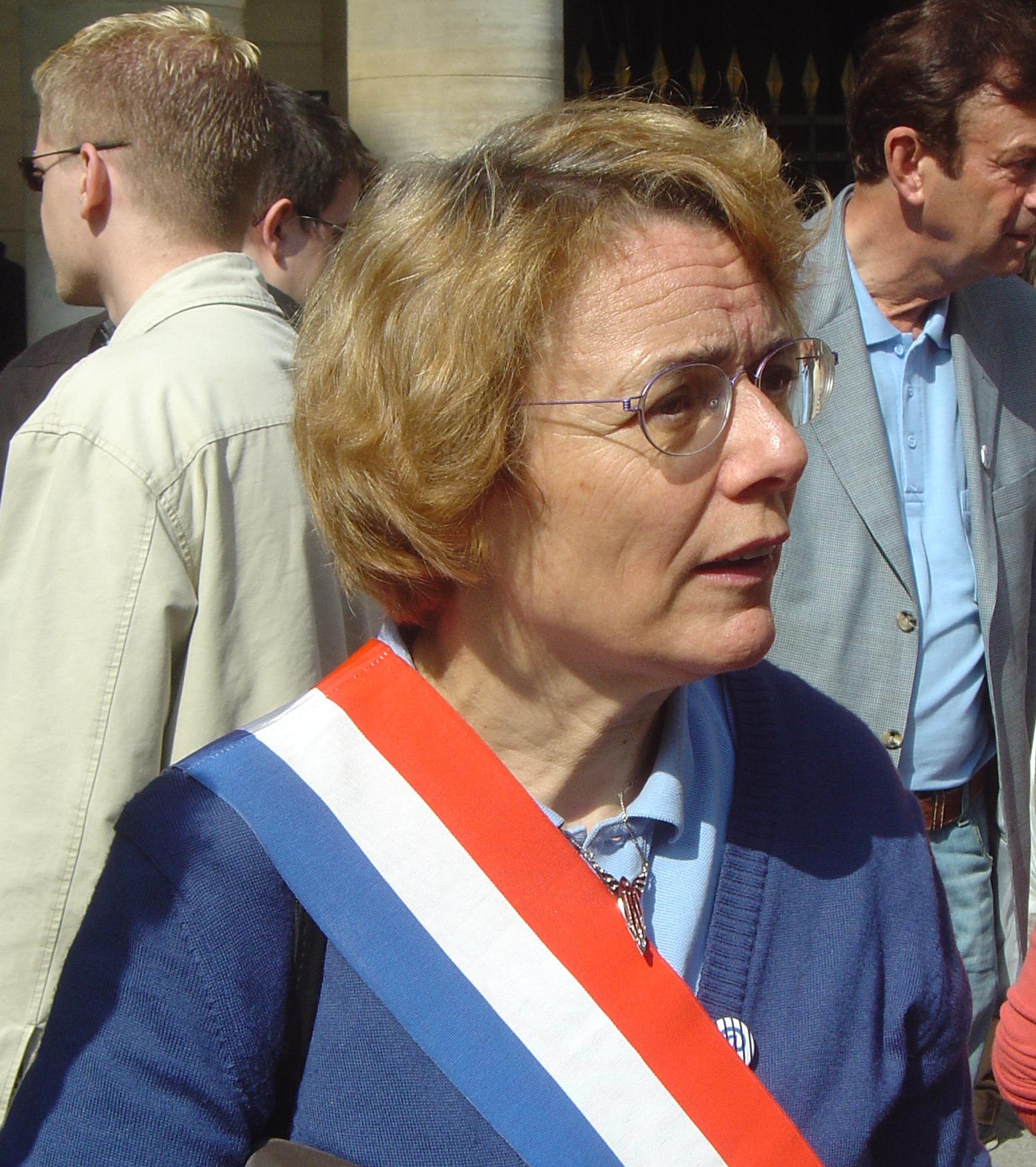
Deputy Martine Billard (Greens, Paris)

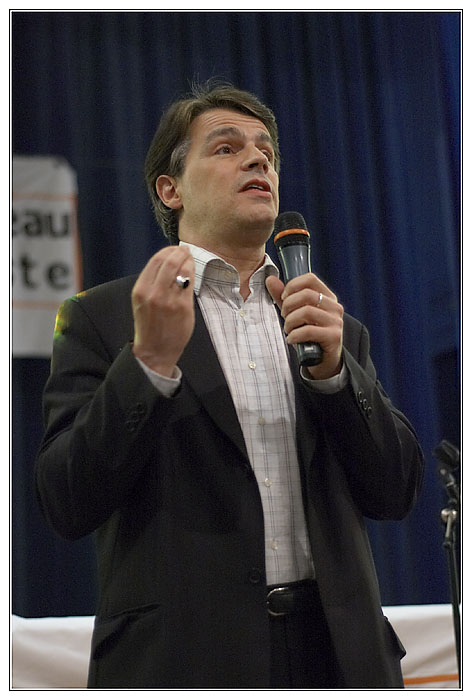
Patrick Bloche, French Socialist Party (left), defended the global license

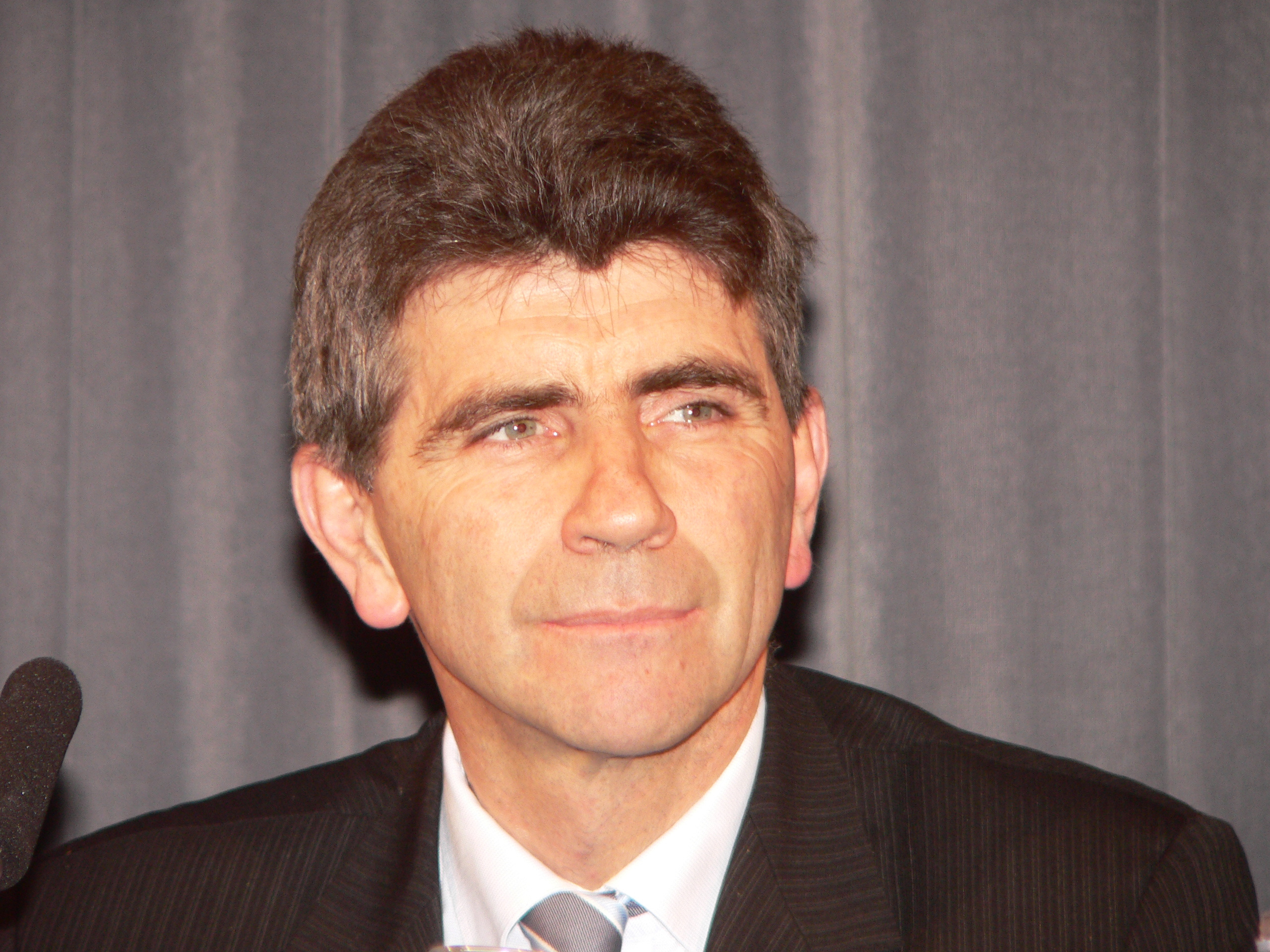
Jean Dionis du Séjour, from UDF

Notable characters in the political debate included:

- Minister of culture Renaud Donnedieu de Vabres. He presented the initial draft of the text, as well as numerous amendments, on behalf of the gouvernement. Donnedieu de Vabres' personal character became an issue with some critics of the law, who underlined the incongruity of having a politician convicted of money laundering give lessons of morality and enact criminal penalties against Internet users.
- Deputies (members of the French National Assembly):
  - UMP (centre-right; absolute majority - voted for the text on March 21, 2006, and on June 30, 2006)
    - Christian Vanneste. He was, on behalf of the Commission of Laws, responsible for drafting the report on the proposed law. He represented the Commission in the debates.
    - Christine Boutin. She opposed several clauses of the text, including the criminalisation of Internet users and measures perceived to be harmful to free software, and supported the "global license".
    - Bernard Carayon. He famously remarked on TV that legislators were put under tremendous strain by powerful lobbies, up to the point of outright blackmail such as threatening to withdraw support for art in the deputy's constituency.
    - Alain Suguenot
    - Richard Cazenave
  - UDF (centrist - opposed or abstained on June 30, 2006)
    - François Bayrou. President of the UDF party, he famously stood against the creation of a "police of the Internet", against measures decried as harmful to free software, and in favour of the right to make private copies. The press commented that this was a way for Bayrou and the UDF to distance itself from the ruling UMP party, despite not formally being in the opposition.
    - Jean Dionis du Séjour and Christophe Baguet were the reporters for the UDF party on the proposed law; they had a somewhat different perspective than Bayrou's.
  - PS (centre-left / left - opposed on the March 21, 2006 and June 30, 2006, votes)
    - Christian Paul
    - Patrick Bloche
    - Didier Mathus
  - Greens (left - opposed on the March 21, 2006 and June 30, 2006, votes)
    - Martine Billard
  - PCF (left - opposed on the March 21, 2006 and June 30, 2006, votes)
    - Frédéric Dutoit
- Other personalities
  - Prime Minister Dominique de Villepin (UMP): declared the law to be urgent, convene the mixed commission, and proposed the bill for a final vote.
  - President of the UMP party Nicolas Sarkozy — following from the disagreements inside his own party, organized a "round table" so as to decide on a common position for his party. Some groups, including EUCD.info and the Odebi League, contend that he has effectively pushed in favour of the law and the so-called "Vivendi Universal" amendments.

Pressure groups:

- Software:
  - Free software
    - EUCD.info
    - Free Software Foundation France
    - AFUL and APRIL
  - Proprietary software and DRMs
    - BSA
- Authors' and artists' societies
  - Opposed to the "global license" and supporting DRMs.
    - Sacem
    - SACD
  - In favour of the "global license".
    - ADAMI
    - SPEDIDAM
- Consumers and Internet users
  - Audionautes
  - UFC Que Choisir
  - Ligue Odebi
- Entertainment industry
  - Vivendi Universal
    - Lobbyist Sylvie Forbin (received the National Order of Merit on June 20, 2006)

== Timeline ==
- November 12, 2003: draft bill proposed by then minister of culture Jean-Jacques Aillagon to the National Assembly
- May 31, 2005: examination of the bill by the Commission of Laws of the Assembly
- December 20–22, 2005: examination in session by the National Assembly, minister of culture Renaud Donnedieu de Vabres defending the bill; the "global license" is voted
- March 7–9, 14 - 16, 2006: examination in session by the National Assembly (continued); the "global license" is repealed
- March 16, 2006: the interoperability / "free software" amendments are voted by the National Assembly
- March 21, 2006: the National Assembly votes the full law
- May 4, May 9–10, 2006: examination in session by the Senate; "interoperability" clauses largely reworded
- June 22, 2006 : mixed Assembly/Senate commission; mostly keeps the Senate version of interoperability
- June 30, 2006 : final votes by the Assembly and the Senate
- August 4, 2006 : law took effect

== See also ==
- Copyright
- HADOPI law
- Ley Sinde

== Analyses ==
- EUCD.info's analyses
- Wikinews, French Parliament adopts controversial copyright bill
- Apple Gets French Support in Music Compatibility Case, Thomas Crampton, The New York Times, July 29, 2006
- La France v. Apple: who’s the dadvsi in DRMs?, Nicolas Jondet (University of Edinburgh), SCRIPT-ed, December 2006
- French Visual Studies, or the Authorized Scholarship, January 12, 2008. On the consequences of DADVSI for French research (specifically visual history)
