= Three strikes =

Three strikes or 3 Strikes may refer to:

- Sentencing and Parole Reform Act 2010 of New Zealand that imposed a "three-strikes law"
  - It was repealed by the Three Strikes Legislation Repeal Act 2022 and
  - reinstated by Sentencing (Reinstating Three Strikes) Amendment Act 2024
- Strikeout (or strike-out) in baseball or softball, when a batter receives three strikes during his time at bat, which leads to an "out"; a strikeout is a statistic recorded for both pitchers and batters
- Three strikes (policy), Internet disconnection for repeat offenders of copyright violations
- Three-strikes law, U.S. state laws for repeat offenders
- Three strikes (Revolutionary War), the three strikes necessary for the American Revolutionary War to start
- Turkey (bowling), in the sport of bowling, three consecutive strikes is known as a "turkey" or "triple"

== Media ==
- 3 Strikes (film), a 2000 comedy film
- 3 Strikes (The Price Is Right), a segment game from the American TV game show The Price Is Right
- "3 Strikes", a song by American band Terror Jr
- Trigger is referred to as "Three Strikes" in the later half of the campaign in Ace Combat 7: Skies Unknown

== See also ==
- Third Strike (disambiguation)
