= Odebi =

The ODEBI League is a French pressure group defending Internet users. Its name, Odebi, is a pun on haut débit, that is, broadband.

The league rose to fame when it opposed the LCEN Internet bill in 2004, then, in 2005 and 2006, the DADVSI bill.
