= Philippe Aigrain =

French computer scientist (1949–2021)

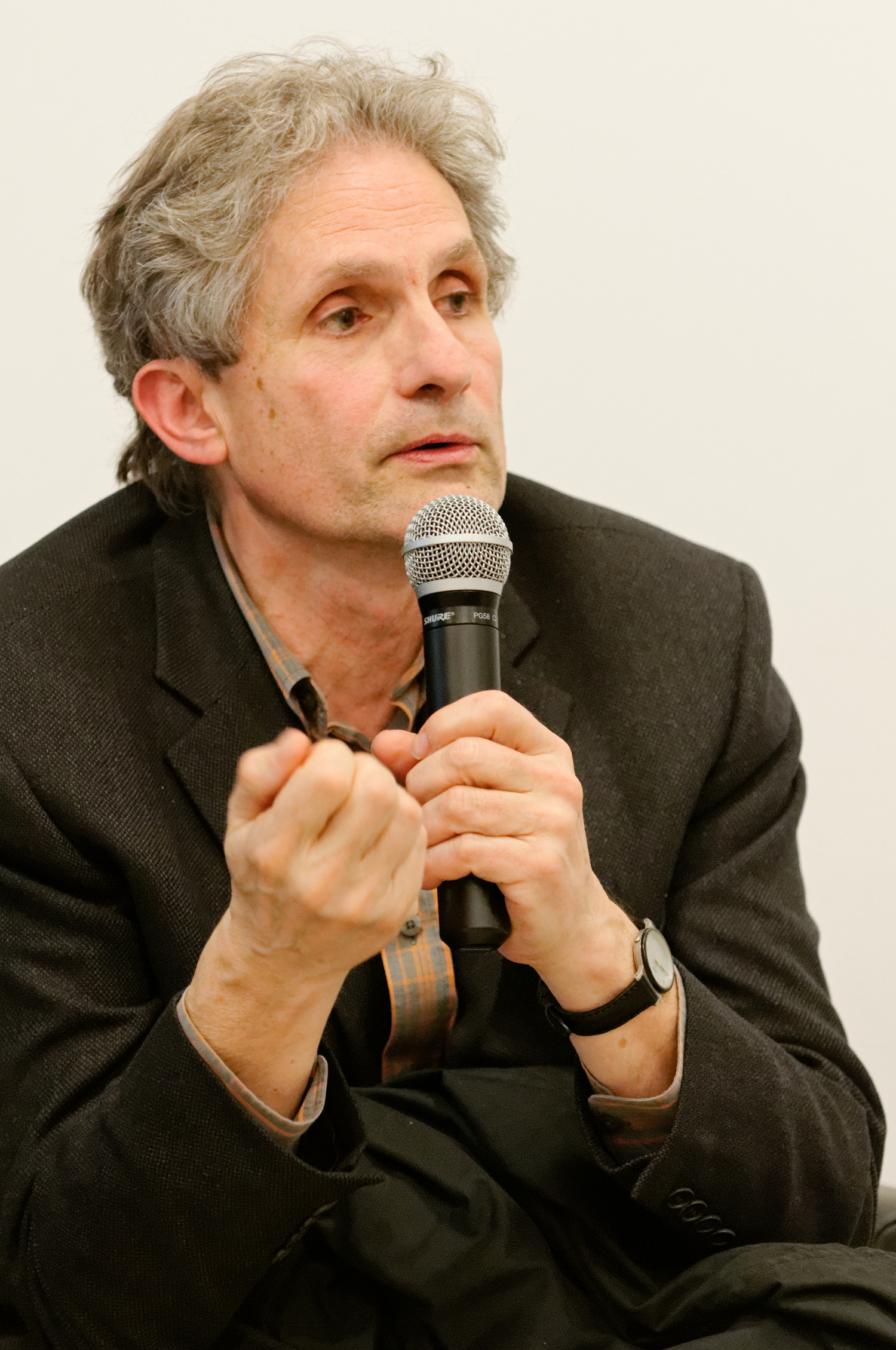
- Philippe Aigrain in the Journée du domaine public, 2012 in Paris
- Born: 15 July 1949
- Died: 11 July 2021 (aged 71)
- Education: Paris Diderot University

Philippe Aigrain (15 July 1949 – 11 July 2021) was a French computer scientist, activist and researcher.

He was one of the directors of the Software Freedom Law Center in New York City and a cofounder of the French non-profit La Quadrature du Net. In 2003, he founded and directed Sopinspace, a solution provider for participatory democracy and public debate using the Internet.

== Theory about sharing and open access ==
Sharing — the act of giving, sending, making available to others copies of files that represent digital works — is the first step of cultural empowerment, of going beyond the pure consumption of products. Sharing was and still is considered a legitimate activity in the world of works on “physical carriers” (books, records, tapes). Up to 35 years ago, copyright never had anything to say about what individuals do between themselves without aiming at profit. What I claim is that the increased effects of sharing in the digital world do not make it less legitimate, but rather more legitimate. When we accept it, we can start addressing the real challenges of digital culture.

== Works ==
- Sharing, Culture and the Economy in the Internet Age, 2012, Amsterdam University Press
- Internet & création: comment reconnaître les échanges hors-marché sur internet en finançant et rémunérant la création ? (2008)
- Cause commune: l'information entre bien commun et propriété (2005)
