= Sylvie Forbin =

French diplomat and WIPO official

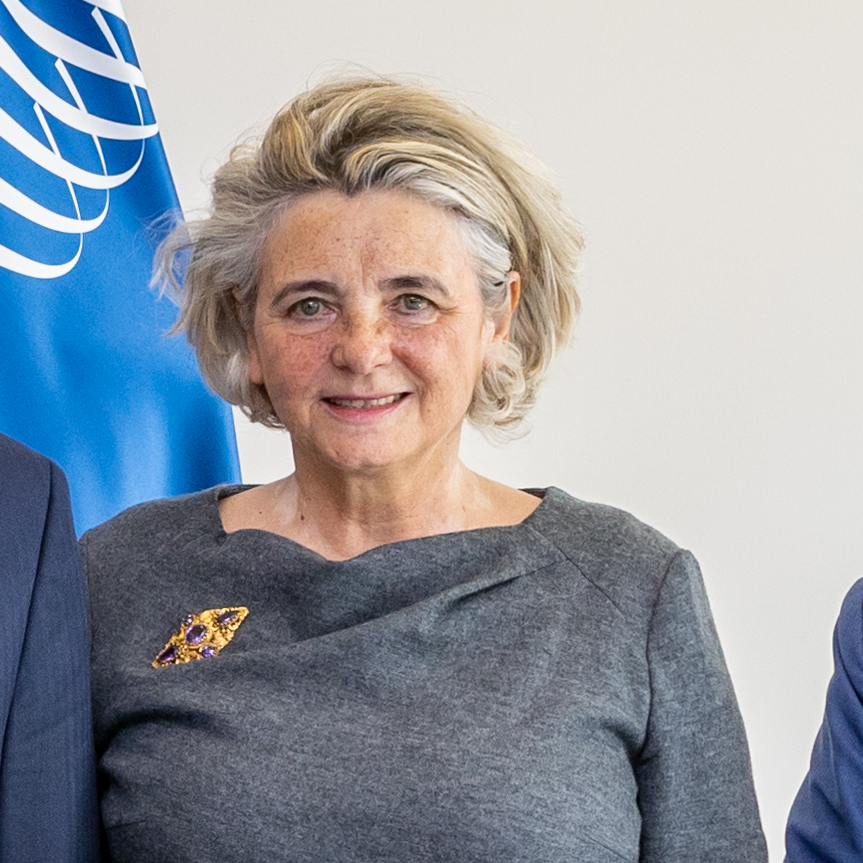
- Forbin in 2023

Deputy Director General of the World Intellectual Property Organization for the Copyright and Creative Industries Sector
- In office 19 September 2016 – 30 September 2026

Personal details
- Born: Sylvie Juliette Cécile Forbin; 16 May 1956 (age 70) France
- Education: Paris-Sorbonne University; Sciences Po; Fondation nationale des sciences politiques
- Occupation: Diplomat, international civil servant

Sylvie Juliette Cécile Forbin (born 16 May 1956) is a French diplomat and international civil servant. She has served as Deputy Director General of the World Intellectual Property Organization (WIPO) responsible for the Copyright and Creative Industries Sector since September 2016.

== Early life and education ==
Forbin was born on 16 May 1956 in France. She obtained a Bachelor of Arts in classics and literature from the University of Paris Sorbonne in 1977, a Master of Arts in international relations from the Institut d'études politiques de Paris in 1980, and a Master of Arts in international economics from the Fondation nationale des sciences politiques in Paris in 1983.

== Career ==
=== Diplomatic service ===
Forbin joined the French Ministry of Foreign Affairs (Quai d'Orsay) in 1983. She served in the Asia and Pacific Directorate in Paris from 1983 to 1986. From 1986 to 1988 she was head of the communications and press services at the French Embassy in Beijing. She then served as counsellor at the Permanent Representation of France to the European Union in Brussels (1989–1990) and as vice cultural counsellor at the French Embassy in Rome (1990–1992).

=== Private sector ===
From 1993 to 2001 Forbin was general manager of Eureka Audiovisual. In 2001 she joined the media and telecommunications group Vivendi as senior vice president for public and European affairs until 2016. In this role she was in charge of with intellectual property rights, new content services, and related public policy issues.

=== World Intellectual Property Organization ===
In July 2016 the Director General of WIPO proposed Forbin's appointment as Deputy Director General for the Copyright and Creative Industries Sector. The WIPO Coordination Committee approved the nomination on 13 September 2016, and she took office on 19 September 2016. In this position she is responsible for WIPO's programmes relating to copyright and related rights, as well as support for creators and the creative industries.

== Personal life ==
Forbin is married to the French diplomat Pierre Sellal.

== Honours ==
- Chevalier of the Ordre national du Mérite (2006)
- Chevalier of the Legion of Honour (2011)
- Officer of the Legion of Honour (1 January 2025 promotion)
