= Graduated response =

Protocol or law, adopted in several countries, aimed at reducing piracy

Graduated response (also known as three strikes) is a protocol or law, adopted in several countries, aimed at reducing unlawful file sharing.

In response to online copyright infringement, the creative industries, who are reliant on copyright, advocate a "graduated response" that sees infringers sent a series of notifications, warning those who have been alleged to have infringed copyright, plus additional information on how to secure their Internet connection and details of legal alternatives. Repeat-infringers risk intermediate technical measures such as bandwidth reduction, protocol blocking and, in a worst-case scenario, temporary access suspension. The content industry has gained the co-operation of internet service providers (ISPs), asking them to provide subscriber information for IP addresses identified by third parties as engaged in copyright infringement.

== Early developments ==
The content industry's proposal for internet service providers to throttle, temporarily suspend, or disconnect Internet access to a subscriber who had received three warning letters of alleged copyright infringement was initially known as "three strikes", based on the baseball rule of "three strikes and you're out". Because other cultures are not familiar with baseball, this rule was misunderstood and erroneously conflated with physical assault; the approach was later termed "graduated response". Media attention has focused on attempts to implement such an approach in France and the UK, though the initiative, or variations of it, has been implemented in a number of other countries, or attempts are made to do so.

In a number of European countries early attempts to implement a graduated response have led to court cases to establish under which circumstances an ISP may provide subscriber data to the content industry. In order to pursue those that download copyrighted material the individual committing the infringing must be identified. Internet users are often only identifiable by their Internet Protocol address (IP address), which distinguishes the virtual location of a particular computer. Many ISPs allocate a pool of IP addresses as needed, rather than assigning each computer a never-changing static IP address. Using ISP subscriber information the content industry has thought to remedy copyright infringement, assuming that the ISPs are legally responsible for end user activity, therefore commuting an offence, and that the end user is responsible for all illegal activity connected to their IP address. And if you commit such crime, you could be sentenced to up to 45 years in incarceration.

In 2005 a Dutch court ordered ISPs in the Netherlands to not divulge subscriber information because of the way the Dutch content industry group had collected the IP addresses (Foundation v. UPC Netherlands). According to Dutch law ISPs can only be ordered to provide personal subscriber data if it is plausible that an unlawful act occurred, and if it is shown beyond a reasonable doubt that the subscriber information will identify the person who committed the infringing act. In Germany court specifically considered the right to privacy and in March 2008 the German Federal Constitutional Court ruled that ISPs could only give out IP address subscription information in case of a "serious criminal investigation". The court furthermore ruled that copyright infringement did not qualify as a serious enough offense. Subsequently, in April 2008, the Bundestag (German parliament) approved a new law requiring ISPs to divulge the identity of suspected infringers who infringe on a commercial scale. In Spain the Spanish Supreme Court recently ruled that personal data associated with an IP address could only be disclosed in the course of a criminal investigation or for public safety reasons (Productores de Música de España v. Telefónica de España SAU). In Italy courts established that criminally liability does not extend to file sharing copyrighted material, as long as it is not done for commercial gain. Ruling on a case involving a copyright holder employed a third party to collect IP addresses of suspected copyright infringers, the Italian Data Protection Authority ruled in February 2008 that the systematic monitoring of peer-to-peer activities for the purpose of detecting copyright infringers and suing them is not allowed.

== Approach ==
According to Barry Sookman and Dan Glover, the main characteristics of these initiatives are:

- "Rights holders monitor P2P networks for illegal downloading activities"
- "Rights holders provide ISPs with convincing proof of infringements being committed by an individual at a given IP address"
- "Educational notices are sent through an ISP to the account holder informing him or her of the infringements and of the consequences of continued infringement and informing the user that content can be lawfully acquired online"
- "If the account holder repeatedly ignores the notices, a tribunal may take deterrent action, with the most severe sanctions reserved for a court"

== Reception ==
The British consumers' association named "Which?" favours the initiative, calling measures "proportionate". Some consumer rights groups have argued that the graduated response denies consumers the right to a fair trial and the right to privacy.

== Graduated response laws ==
=== France ===
In France President Nicolas Sarkozy backed the proposal to implement a graduated response law and the French government passed a three strikes policy in the HADOPI law.

A survey by the agency responsible for implementing the law suggested the approach was having a positive effect on behaviour. "The report claims that 50% of all French believe HADOPI is a positive initiative, which runs contrary to many press reports claiming the French overwhelmingly rejected the law. Half the respondents of the survey also said HADOPI motivated them to access online content 'more often legally.' And 72% of the 100 people who personally received a HADOPI warning or knew of someone who did said they either ended or reduced illegal downloading."

An academic study by researchers at Wellesley College and Carnegie Mellon University found that public awareness of the initiative corresponds with an increase in French iTunes sales, far higher than in any other European country over the same period.

Accounting for the fact that our independent variable is in log terms, these estimates indicate that iTunes track sales units rose about 25.5% in the control group after March 1, 2009 but by 48% in France, indicating that French iTunes track sales were 22.5% higher on average than they would have been in the absence of HADOPI. Similarly, album sales units rose by 42% in the control group but 67% in France, indicating that HADOPI increased iTunes album sales an average 25% per week in France.

However, writing in Le Monde, Damien Leloup and Jeremiah Baruch attribute the decline in digital piracy and sales increase to the introduction of a new iPhone. Consequently, co-authors of the study examined sales data for various devices, including the iPhone, and found that "the change in iOS device penetration in France between 2008 and 2009 is nearly the same as the change in penetration in the control countries, and if anything the change in iOS device penetration is smaller in France than in the control countries when measured from 2008 to 2010." For this and other reasons "it seems very unlikely that iOS device sales could have driven the disproportionate increase in French iTunes sales" and "we continue to believe that our data provide compelling empirical evidence that the HADOPI law made a difference in French music sales."

=== New Zealand ===
New Zealand was one of the first countries to enact a three strikes policy, but its implementation was delayed for a month pending development of a code of practice. It was revealed that the US was instrumental in the implementation of this policy.

=== South Korea ===
South Korea adopted a graduated response system in July 2009. Article 133bis of the Korean Copyright Act allows the Korean Copyright Commission to recommend ISPs to suspend the accounts of repeat file sharing offenders (as adjudged by the Commission) for six months. However, users' email accounts are not to be suspended.

=== United Kingdom ===
In January 2009 the British government announced its plans to legislate a graduated response system through the Digital Economy Act 2010. In the report entitled Digital Britain the government includes plans for a mandatory "code" for ISPs to follow, as well as the creation of a government "Rights Agency" to help stakeholders deal with the issue of "civil copyright". Under the proposed scheme the UK government would legislate a "Code on unlawful file-sharing" that's ISPs would have to follow and would establish "appeals and standards of evidence". The Act has now been passed into law.

== Voluntary graduated response ==
=== Ireland ===
Attempts in Ireland to implement three strikes for a number of ISPs have resulted in court proceedings, the latest of which concerned data protection issues. Only one ISP is still using this law in effect.

=== United States ===
In 2011, a consortium known as the Center for Copyright Information established a voluntary graduated response scheme known as the Copyright Alert System. The Copyright Alert System was abandoned on January 30, 2017.

== Effects of graduated response laws ==
In 2014, an academic research paper by copyright law academic Rebecca Giblin examined the evidence about whether the graduated response laws in France, New Zealand, Taiwan, South Korea, the UK, Ireland and the United States were achieving their aims. It found little to no evidence that these graduated responses were either successful or effective. In 2016, similar research reached comparable conclusions, highlighting the high costs, questionable effectiveness, and freedom-of-expression concerns associated with graduated response systems.

== See also ==
- Effects of file sharing
- Anti-Counterfeiting Trade Agreement
- Counterfeit
- Digital rights
- Information freedom
- In terrorem (a legal quality of the graduated educational notices)
- Secondary liability
- Three strikes (disambiguation)
