= Digital Britain =

UK government report

The Digital Britain report was a policy document published in 2009, which outlined the United Kingdom Government's strategic vision for ensuring that the country is at the leading edge of the global digital economy.

The Digital Economy Act 2010 was one of the outcomes of this policy.

== History ==
The UK government announced on 29 January 2009 that it planned to have 100% broadband coverage in the UK by 2012, with a minimum speed of 2 Mbit/s. Some industry experts, including broadband think tank PointTopic and measurement site SamKnows, claimed that these plans were ill thought out. However, a government-backed forum hoped to address such issues, with a view to succeeding within the 2012 deadline.

Closely based on a 2007 government-commissioned think tank report from The Work Foundation, the final Digital Britain report was released on 16 June 2009, and made a number of recommendations with regard to broadband access, internet use and public service broadcasting. Among these recommendations were:

- Three year plan to boost digital participation
- Universal access to broadband by 2012
- Fund to invest in next generation broadband
- Digital radio upgrade by 2015
- Liberalisation of 3G spectrum
- Support for public service content partnerships
- Changed role for Channel 4
- Consultation on how to fund local, national and regional news
- A new "more robust system" for the classification of video games

In August 2009, responsibility for the project was moved to Stephen Timms, the Financial Secretary, who was previously the minister responsible for e-commerce and used to work in the telecoms industry. He reported to Peter Mandelson.

Mandelson had been seeking a legal and regulatory attack on copyright infringement by statutory instrument. In November 2009 he added these measures into the Digital Economy Bill, but faced objections from leading internet companies.

The Pre-Budget Report in December 2009 included a new tax of £6 p.a. on home land lines to fund the expansion of broadband. This was included in the March 2010 United Kingdom Budget, but dropped from the Finance Bill due to lack of time after the general election was called. In his Budget speech, Chancellor Alistair Darling had also announced tax breaks for the British video game industry, and reiterated the Government's target of 90% Broadband coverage by 2017—but omitted to repeat the target of 100% by 2020.

In March 2010 the Department for Business, Innovation and Skills announced the National Plan for Digital Participation, aiming "to ensure that everyone who wants to be online can get online, do more online and benefit from the advantages of being online."

The Digital Britain report served as a catalyst for a number of later initiatives led by the public and private sectors. In October 2019, the Lord Mayor of London launched "future.now", a consortium of leading companies, education providers, and charities working in collaboration with government to empower everyone to thrive in a digital UK. Pre-eminent firms in the digital economy including Accenture, BT Group, Digital British, Deloitte, and Nominet have either directly supported the coalition or made statements in support of improving digital skills for longer term economic benefit.

== See also ==
- Broadband universal service
- Satellite Internet access
