= April (French association) =

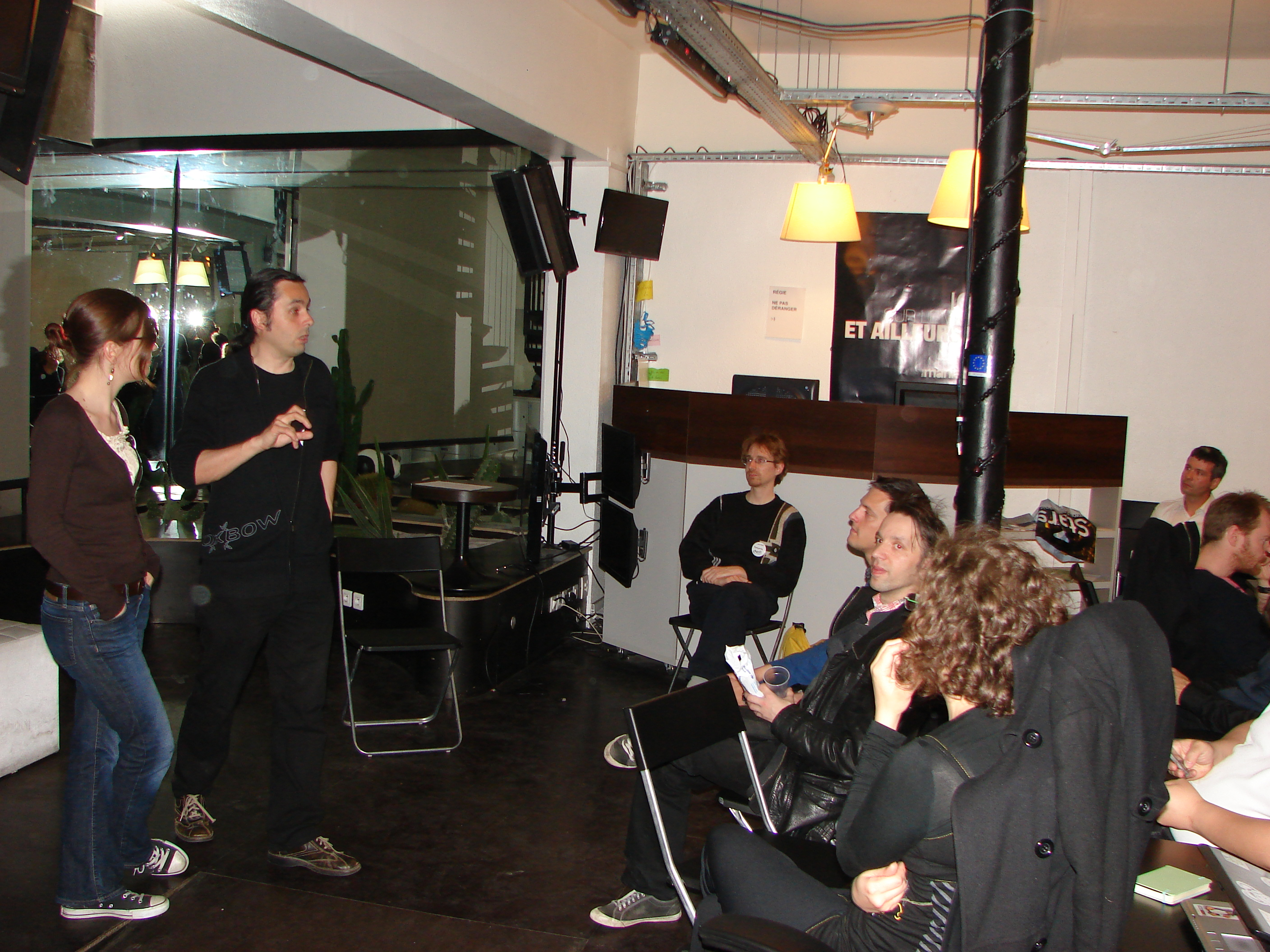
Presentation by Frédéric Couchet at the April Entreprise Camp at La Cantine on Thursday, May 3, 2012.

April is an association for the promotion of free software in the French-speaking world. Since its inception in 1996, April has maintained a close relationship with the Free Software Foundation, establishing a working group to undertake a French-language exposition of the GNU project's philosophy.

The group's name is an acronym standing for Association pour la Promotion et la Recherche en Informatique Libre (meaning Association for the Promotion and Study of Free Computing). Regarding the name, the French term libre always means "free-as-in-freedom" and never "free-as-in-beer".

Membership is open to both physical persons and institutions. Annual dues for individuals are 10 euro. Dues for institutional memberships are assessed on a sliding scale according to size, total sales, or budget as appropriate.

== Important dates ==
- November 1998: April welcomes Richard Stallman at its conference at Université Paris 8 for the first time.
- April 2001: Frédéric Couchet, Loïc Dachary and Raphaël Rousseau establish FSF France by modifying Gna.org.
- June 2009: The association's enlistment reaches 5000 members.
