= Conseil supérieur de la propriété littéraire et artistique =

Conseil supérieur de la propriété littéraire et artistique (Superior Council of Artistic and Literary Property)
- Formation: 10 Jul 2000
- Type: Independent advisory body
- Headquarters: France Immeuble des Bons-Enfants, 182, rue Saint-Honoré, Paris
- Coordinates: 48.862499°N 2.338947°E
- Members: 32 members of law and 8 qualified persons
- Président: Pierre-François Racine
- Website: Long official website

In France, the Conseil supérieur de la propriété littéraire et artistique (Superior Council of Artistic and Literary Property) (CSPLA) is an independent advisory body to advise the Minister of Culture and Communication in the field of literary and artistic property. It also observes and advises on matters of copyright and related rights.

== Description ==
The Higher Council for Literary and Artistic Property was founded on 10 July 2000.

It is chaired by Président and Chairperson Pierre-François Racine, Counsellor of State, appointed by a decree dated October 2, 2012; his vice president is Anne-Élisabeth Crédeville, at the Court of Cassation, appointed by a decree dated October 7, 2010.

== List of presidents ==
- Pierre-François Racine (since 2012)
- Sylvie Hubac (2010-2012)
- Jean-Ludovic Silicani (2001-2009)

== See also ==
- French Intellectual Property Code
