= The Pirate Bay (TV series) =

Swedish television drama series

- Based on: Pirate Bay
- Country of origin: Sweden

Original release
- Network: SVT
- Release: 2024

The Pirate Bay is a Swedish drama series that premiered on SVT and SVT Play on 8 November 2024. The series is directed by Jens Sjögren, who also wrote the script with Piotr Marcinak, Jakob Beckman, and Patrik Gyllström. The first season consists of six episodes and is based on true events, namely the events surrounding the dramatic years when The Pirate Bay was a leading actor in the exploding file sharing culture.

== Reception ==
Swedish newspaper Aftonbladet gave the series a mixed review. It received a generally negative review in Svenska Dagbladet.

== Cast ==
- Arvid Swedrup – Gottfrid Svartholm Warg
- Willjam Lempling – Fredrik Neij
- Simon Gregor Carlsson – Peter Sunde
- Philip Zandén – Peter Althin
- Helena Bergström – Monique Wadsted
- Robin Stegmar – Henrik Pontén
- Rodrigo Cartault – Oded Daniel
- Max Vobora – Rasmus Fleischer
- Maria Sundbom Lörelius – Karin Pontén
- Emil Almén – Johan
- Henrik Norlén – Carl Lundström
- Per Svensson – Håkan Roswall
- Elvis Stegmar – Markus Pontén
- Merima Dizdarević – Adriana
- Eric Rusch – Tomas Norström
- Niki Löfberg – Lauri Hansen
- Ruben Gullback Levis – Pirat Party member
