= Aiding and abetting =

Legal doctrine

Aiding and abetting is a legal doctrine related to the guilt of someone who aids or abets (encourages, incites) another person in the commission of a crime (or in another's suicide). It exists in a number of different countries and generally allows a court to pronounce someone guilty for aiding and abetting in a crime even if they are not the principal offender. English common law distinguished aiding and abetting from being an accessory before the fact in that the former required presence at the crime, while the latter required absence from the crime. Some jurisdictions maintain that distinction. Other jurisdictions have merged being an accessory before the fact with aiding and abetting.

== Canada ==
In Canada, a person who aids or abets in the commission of a crime is treated the same as a principal offender under the criminal law. Section 21(1) of the Criminal Code provides that:

Every one is a party to an offence who

(a) actually commits it;
(b) does or omits to do anything for the purpose of aiding any person to commit it; or
(c) abets any person in committing it.

To show that an accused aided or abetted in the commission of a crime, the Crown does not need to prove the guilt of a specific principal offender.

The Crown must show something more than mere presence to prove the act of aiding or abetting. Presence in the commission of a crime might be evidence of aiding and abetting if the accused had prior knowledge of the crime, or if the accused had legal duty or control over the principal offender. For example, the owner of a car who lets another person drive dangerously without taking steps to prevent it may be guilty because of their control over the driver's use of the vehicle.

Further, the Crown must show that the accused had prior knowledge that "an offence of the type committed was planned", but it is not necessary that the accused desired the result or had the motive of assisting the crime. Intention to assist the crime is sufficient.

== Sweden ==
Aiding (medhjälp) and abetting (anstiftan) is regulated in the Penal Code (Brottsbalken) chapter 23, section 4. The principal crime must be punishable with imprisonment, in order for aiding and abetting to be punishable. The most high-profile case in which someone has been convicted of aiding and abetting in Sweden is The Pirate Bay trial where Fredrik Neij, Gottfrid Svartholm, and Peter Sunde was convicted of both aiding (through the services provided by The Pirate Bay) and abetting (by promoting copyright infringement) serious copyright infringement. In normal cases, copyright infringement is classed as a misdemeanor and usually only punishable with fines so aiding and abetting would not be illegal. But in this case the scale of the operation made the Stockholm District Court to label the principal crime as "serious" (with a minimal punishment of six months imprisonment) and thereby making it a felony. Even though nobody was ever charged with the principal crime, aiding and abetting was still punishable because of imprisonment as the minimal punishment for the principal crime.

== United States ==
=== Criminal ===
Aiding and abetting is an additional provision in United States criminal law, for situations where it cannot be shown the party personally carried out the criminal offense, but where another person may have carried out the illegal act(s) as an agent of the charged, working together with or under the direction of the charged, who is an accessory to the crime. It is comparable to laws in some other countries governing the actions of accessories, including the similar provision in England and Wales under the Accessories and Abettors Act 1861.

It is codified in 18 U.S.C. § 2:

(a) Whoever commits an offense against the United States or aids, abets, counsels, commands, induces or procures its commission, is punishable as a principal.

(b) Whoever willfully causes an act to be done which if directly performed by him or another would be an offense against the United States, is punishable as a principal.

The scope of this federal statute for aiders and abettors "is incredibly broad—it can be implied in every charge for a federal substantive offense". The term "principal" refers to any actor who is primarily responsible for a criminal offense.

For a successful prosecution, the provision of "aiding and abetting" must be considered alongside the crime itself, although a defendant can be found guilty of aiding and abetting an offense even if the principal is found not guilty of the crime itself. In all cases of aiding and abetting, it must be shown a crime has been committed, but not necessarily who committed it. It is necessary to show that the defendant has willfully associated himself with the crime being committed, that he does, through his own act or omission, as he would do if he wished for a criminal venture to succeed. Under this statute, anyone who aids or abets a crime may be charged directly with the crime, as if the charged had carried out the act himself. This is distinct from the concept of being an accessory after the fact, a charge distinct from being a principal.

=== History ===
The first United States statute dealing with accessory liability was passed in 1790, and made criminally liable those who should aid and assist, procure, command, counsel or advise murder or robbery on land or sea, or piracy at sea. This was broadened in 1870 to include any felony, and by it an accessory was anyone who counsels, advises or procures the crime. These early statutes were repealed in 1909, and supplanted by 18 U.S.C. § 550, a statute which included the modern language of: "Whoever aids, abets, counsels, commands, induces, or procures the commission of an offense is a principal."

In 1948, § 550 became 18 U.S.C. § 2(a). Section 2(b) was also added to make clear the legislative intent to punish as a principal not only one who directly commits an offense and one who "aids, abets, counsels, commands, induces or procures" another to commit an offense, but also anyone who causes the doing of an act which if done by him directly would render him guilty of an offense against the United States. It removes all doubt that one who puts in motion or assists in the illegal enterprise or causes the commission of an indispensable element of the offense by an innocent agent or instrumentality is guilty as a principal even though he intentionally refrained from the direct act constituting the completed offense.

Subsection (a) of Section 2 was amended to its current form in 1951 to read, "Whoever commits an offense against the United States or aids, abets, counsels, commands, induces or procures its commission, is punishable as a principal." Subsection (b) was also amended in 1951 to add "wilfully" and "is punishable as a principal".

=== Application to "white collar crimes" ===
Since 2001, the Securities and Exchange Commission has filed a number of complaints related to the aiding and abetting of securities fraud. For example, CIBC and Merrill Lynch were separately charged with aiding and abetting Enron’s evasion of record keeping requirements and required financial controls. Settlements, including disgorgement, penalties, and interest reached $80 million in both cases.

=== Civil ===
Aiding and abetting is also a legal theory of civil accessory liability. To prove accessory liability through "aiding and abetting", the plaintiffs must prove three elements:

- That Defendant B breached a duty to Plaintiff, the result of which injured Plaintiff;
- That Defendant A knowingly and substantially assisted Defendant B in breaching the duty; and
- That Defendant A was aware of its role in promoting the breach of duty at the time it provided assistance.

== United Kingdom ==
=== England and Wales ===
The Accessories and Abettors Act 1861 provides that an accessory to an indictable offence shall be treated in the same way as if he had actually committed the offence himself. Section 8 of the Act, as amended, reads:

Whosoever shall aid, abet, counsel, or procure the commission of any indictable offence, whether the same be an offence at common law or by virtue of any Act passed or to be passed, shall be liable to be tried, indicted, and punished as a principal offender.

(Section 10 states that the Act does not apply to Scotland.)

Section 44(1) of the Magistrates' Courts Act 1980 makes similar provision for summary offences. It says:

A person who aids, abets, counsels or procures the commission by another person of a summary offence shall be guilty of the like offence and may be tried (whether or not they are charged as a principal) either by a court having jurisdiction to try that other person or by a court having by virtue of his own offence jurisdiction to try him.

In the case of R v Jogee, the Supreme Court of the United Kingdom held in 2016 that an accessory can be guilty of the principal's crime only if the accessory intended to assist the principal to commit the crime while having the necessary mens rea to commit that crime.

==== Derek Bentley case ====
One of the most notorious cases of this type was the 1952 case in England involving Derek Bentley, a mentally challenged man who was in police custody when his sixteen-year-old companion, Christopher Craig, shot and killed a police constable during a botched break-in. Craig was sentenced to be detained at Her Majesty's Pleasure, since as a juvenile offender he could not be sentenced to death (he was released after serving ten years), but Bentley was hanged despite popular protest. The incident was dramatized in the film Let Him Have It, which is what Bentley allegedly said to Craig during the incident, which can be interpreted either as telling Craig to shoot the policeman, or to give him the gun. The hanging of Bentley led to public outrage and sparked the MP Sydney Silverman's campaign to abolish capital punishment in the United Kingdom, achieved in 1965.

=== Scotland ===
In Scotland aiding and abetting is known as "art and part". Section 293 of the Criminal Procedure (Scotland) Act 1995 says:

(1) A person may be convicted of, and punished for, a contravention of any enactment, notwithstanding that he was guilty of such contravention as art and part only.
(2) Without prejudice to subsection (1) above or to any express provision in any enactment having the like effect to this subsection, any person who aids, abets, counsels, procures or incites any other person to commit an offence against the provisions of any enactment shall be guilty of an offence and shall be liable on conviction, unless the enactment otherwise requires, to the same punishment as might be imposed on conviction of the first-mentioned offence.

== See also ==
- Common purpose
