= The Pirate Bay raid =

2006 police raid in Stockholm, Sweden

Video footage taken during the Pirate Bay raid

The Pirate Bay raid took place on 31 May 2006 in Stockholm, when the Pirate Bay, a Swedish website that indexes torrent files, was raided by Swedish police, causing it to go offline for three days. Upon reopening, the site's number of visitors more than doubled, the increased popularity attributed to greater exposure through the media coverage.

The raid, alleged by Pirate Bay to be politically motivated and under pressure from the Motion Picture Association of America (MPAA), was reported as a success by the MPAA in the immediate aftermath, but with the website being restored within days and the raising of the debate in Sweden, commentators such as TorrentFreak called the raid "highly unsuccessful". On 31 January 2008, Swedish prosecutors filed charges against four of the individuals behind The Pirate Bay for "promoting other people's infringements of copyright laws".

== Execution ==
At roughly 11:00 UTC on 31 May 2006, a major raid against The Pirate Bay and people involved with the website took place, prompted by allegations of copyright violations and formally ordered by judge Tomas Norström, who later presided on the 2009 trial. Some 65 police officers participated in the raid, shutting down the website and confiscating its servers, as well as all other servers hosted by The Pirate Bay's Internet service provider, PRQ. The company is owned by two operators of The Pirate Bay. Three people—Gottfrid Svartholm, Mikael Viborg, and Fredrik Neij—were held by the police for questioning, but were released later in the evening. Mikael Viborg, the legal advisor to The Pirate Bay, was arrested at his apartment, brought in for questioning, forced to submit a DNA sample and had his electronic equipment seized.

Many servers in the server room were seized, including those running the website of Piratbyrån, an independent organisation fighting for file sharing rights, as well as servers unrelated to The Pirate Bay or other file sharing activities, including a Russian opposition news agency and GameSwitch, a British game server host.

== Political issues ==
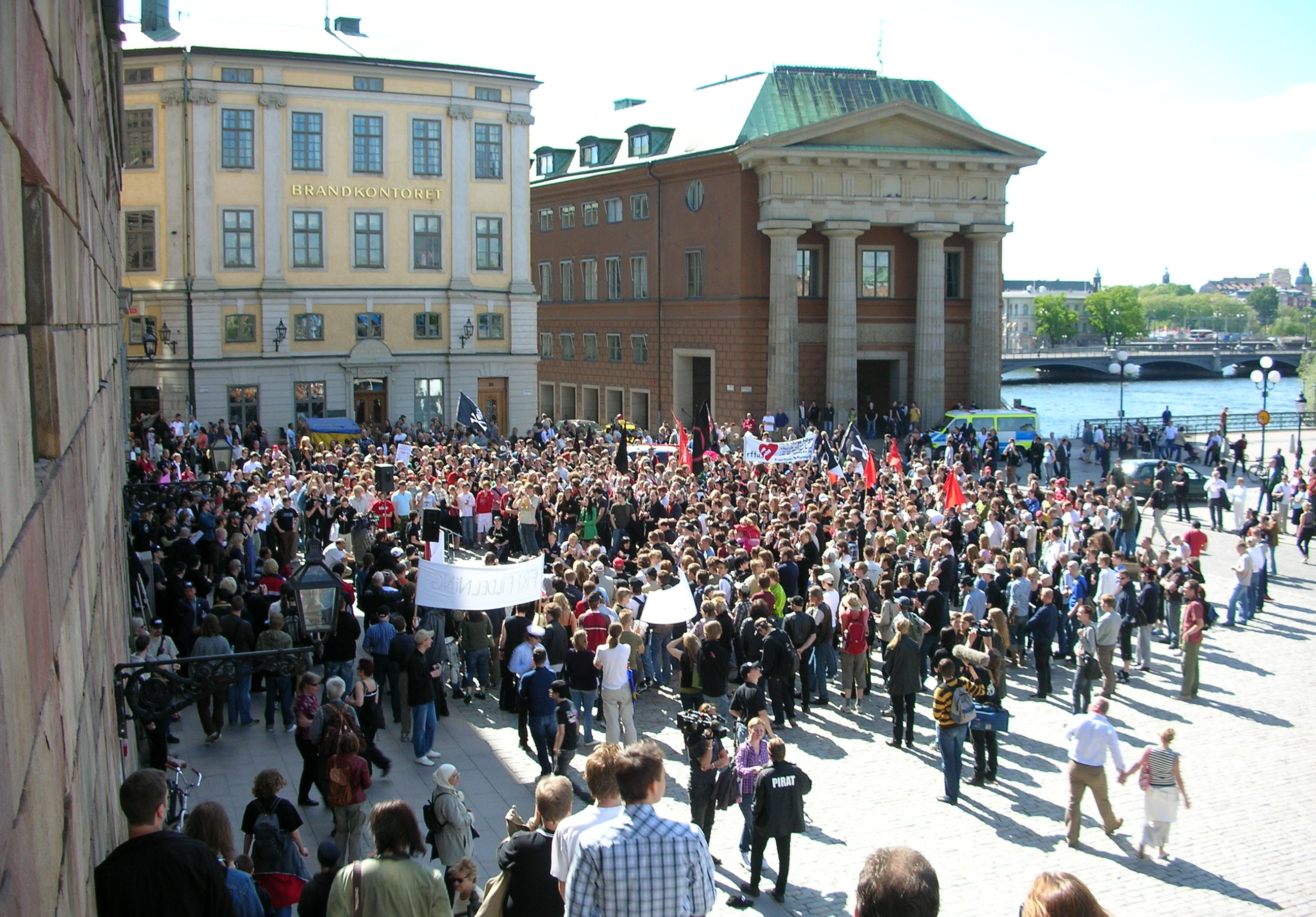
Swedes protesting against the police raid during the pro-piracy demonstration on June 3, 2006

The Swedish public broadcast network, Sveriges Television, cited unnamed sources claiming that the raid was prompted by political pressure from the United States, which the Swedish government denied. Sveriges Television claimed that the Swedish government was threatened by the World Trade Organization with trade sanctions unless action was taken against The Pirate Bay.

There have been claims of politicians pressuring other government agencies to take action in connection with this allegation, which is unconstitutional in Sweden. A letter titled "Re: The Pirate Bay" from the Motion Picture Association of America (MPAA) to Dan Eliasson, State Secretary at the Swedish Ministry of Justice, was dated two months before the raid and hinted at trade reprisals ("It is certainly not in Sweden's best interests to earn a reputation as a place where utter lawlessness is tolerated") and urged him to "exercise your influence to urge law enforcement officers in Sweden to take much-needed action against The Pirate Bay".

The MPAA wrote in a press release: "Since filing a criminal complaint in Sweden in November 2004, the film industry has worked vigorously with Swedish and U.S. government officials in Sweden to shut this illegal website down." MPAA CEO Dan Glickman also stated, "Intellectual property theft is a problem for film industries all over the world and we are glad that the local government in Sweden has helped stop The Pirate Bay from continuing to enable rampant copyright theft on the Internet."

== Aftermath ==
After the raid, The Pirate Bay displayed a "SITE DOWN" message confirming that Swedish police had executed search warrants for breach of copyright law or assisting such a breach. The BitTorrent community quickly spread the announcement across online news sites, blogs, and discussion forums. The closure message initially caused some confusion because on 1 April 2005 The Pirate Bay had posted a similar message, stating that they were permanently down due to a supposed raid by the Swedish Anti-Piracy Bureau and IFPI, as a prank. Piratbyrån set up temporary news blog to inform the public about the incident.

Logo shown on The Pirate Bay homepage after the May 2006 police raid in Sweden, written as "Hollywood".

The reincarnated website was, as stated by "Peter" in the Chaosradio International interview with Tim Pritlove, running on servers located in the Netherlands. As of 3 June, the search function was not available. It was possible to browse for .torrent files manually and download them, but attempts at downloading .torrent files for most copyrighted materials gave 404 Not Found errors. On 5 June 2006, The Pirate Bay went down, citing database server problems. It was back up the next day, but with limited availability. The Pirate Bay attributed these issues to increased traffic resulting from the recent publicity and promised that the website would soon be running smoothly again. TPB thereafter fixed a number of minor software bugs and brought new servers online to handle the increased traffic load. By 9 June, the website was once again fully functional. On 14 June 2006, the Swedish news agency TT reported that The Pirate Bay was back in Sweden due to "pressure from the Department of Justice [in the Netherlands]."

During the afternoon of 1 June, again on 3 June, and again in the morning of 4 June, the website of the Swedish police went down due to high load. It was speculated that this was a retaliatory denial-of-service attack in response to the TPB raid. According to a Swedish article in the IT news website IDG, the downtime resulted from many requests for a specific url—which had been widely circulated via IRC chatrooms and internet forums. According to the article, the purpose was to "show what you think of the police's behaviour."

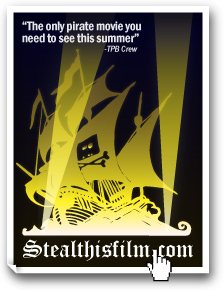
Steal This Film poster mockup

The Pirate Bay is considered part of an international anti-copyright movement.

Since the raid, Pirate Bay stated their disaster recovery plan of "a few days" worked correctly, but that they are now moving to redundant servers both in Belgium and Russia, and an aim of a few hours restoration time, should the servers be disrupted again. Following the raid, the number of Pirate Bay users grew from 1 million to 2.7 million. The number of peers grew almost 5 times, from 2.5 million to 12 million. It has been reported that the Pirate Bay claims more than 5 million active users. Internet traffic ranker Alexa.com ranks Pirate Bay as the 73rd most popular website in the world.

== Charges ==
In May 2007, prosecutor Håkan Roswall made it clear that he intended to press charges against the administrators of The Pirate Bay. In mid-January 2008 Peter Sunde told Ars Technica: "I'm quite sure we won't be convicted anyhow" and "[If we are], we'll just appeal all the way to the European Union court. So in five years time this might be settled."

On 31 January 2008, Pirate Bay operators Fredrik Neij, Gottfrid Svartholm, Peter Sunde and Carl Lundström were charged with "promoting other people's infringements of copyright laws." If convicted, the defendants face up to two years in prison and SEK 1.2 million in restitution. Pirate Bay's legal advisor, Mikael Viborg, has stated that because torrent files and trackers merely point to content, the site's activities are legal under Swedish law. Magnus Martensson, legal advisor for the International Federation of the Phonographic Industry (IFPI), says the website is damaging to industry and liable for at least contributory copyright infringement.

== Allegations ==
Soon after the police investigation of The Pirate Bay finished in 2008, lead investigator Jim Keyzer left the police force briefly to work for MPAA member studio Warner Brothers, according to his since-deleted Facebook profile. Sydsvenskan reported that Keyzer had already been working for the studio while the investigation into The Pirate Bay was still open. An April 2008 Pirate Party press release called the potential conflict of interest a "bribing scandal". Piratbyrån wrote about the allegations:

If the trial wasn't already just a political theatre, this clearly shows that this is not a fair and balanced trial. The copyright industry stands no chance in an objective legal judgement and therefore have to cheat their way forward. Their legitimacy has hit rock bottom

These matters have not been resolved in court and even though Keyzer was scheduled to be a witness in the Pirate Bay trial, he was not called.

== 2014 raid ==
On 9 December 2014, a second 'Pirate Bay raid' occurred when police in Stockholm, Sweden raided The Pirate Bay and seized servers and other computers and equipment.
