= Tony Wiklander =

Swedish politician (born 1938)

Tony Wiklander SD
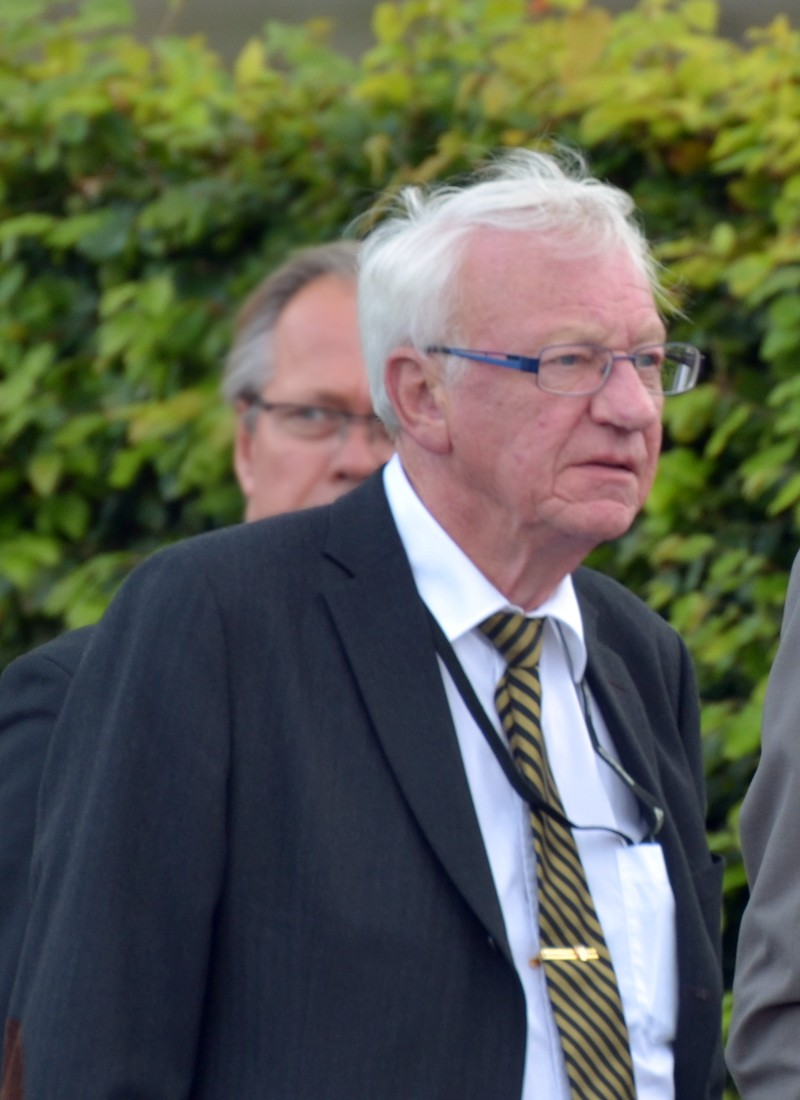

Member of the Riksdag
- In office 2010–2018
- Constituency: Västra Götaland

Personal details
- Born: Tony Göte Sigfrid Wiklander; 3 June 1939 (age 86) Mölndal, Sweden
- Party: Sweden Democrats (2001-); Progress Party (1989-2001); Swedish Social Democrats (1980s); Left Party (1970s)

Tony Göte Sigfrid Wiklander (born 1938) is a Swedish politician of the Sweden Democrats party and a retired member of parliament who sat in the Riksdag from 2010 to 2018. Wiklander was previously the leader and chairman of the Progress Party.

== Biography ==
Wiklander established himself as a local politician in Åstorp and was a member of the Left Party and the Social Democrats. In 1989, he was elected as chairman of the Helsingborg based Progress Party. He was expelled as chairman of the party due to comments in the media that were seen as too extreme and his connections with the early Sweden Democrats and the New Swedish Movement. Wiklander then chose to establish a new party with the old Progress Party name in October the same year in Åstorp with economic support from millionaire Carl Lundström while the Helsingborg wing continued as a separate party. Wiklander's Åstorp faction started a cooperation with New Democracy. As New Democracy emerged with similar policies, Lundström changed his support to New Democracy. The original Helsingborg chapter of the Progress Party then reshaped itself into Svensk Samling which merged into the Sweden Democrats in 1998. Later, most of the Svensk Samling defectors to the Sweden Democrats joined the National Democrats which was formed after an extreme wing of the Sweden Democrats were ousted and split from the party. Wiklander waited until after the split of the Sweden Democrats in 2001 and thereafter merged his faction of the party with the Sweden Democrats, the more moderate faction.

After joining the Sweden Democrats, Wiklander was elected to the Riksdag for the party in 2010. He retired from parliament at the 2018 Swedish general election.
