= IPredator =

Virtual private network service

- Website type: Virtual private network
- Successor: Njalla
- Founder: Peter Sunde
- Website: www.ipredator.se
- Launched: September 14, 2009; 17 years ago

IPredator was a VPN service offered with the stated goal of providing internet privacy. It was co-founded by Peter Sunde, as a response to the introduction of IPRED in Sweden, which will allow copyright holders and law enforcement officials to request personal information about copyright infringement suspects.

== History ==
On 12 August 2009, beta testing invitations were sent out to those who entered their email addresses into the beta signup form. Additionally, the homepage has changed to reflect the beta. The service initially only used PPTP (supported natively in XP, Vista, Windows 7, OS X and Linux through the use of PPTP-linux) to tunnel the connection through servers (vpn.ipredator.se which resolves to multiple IP addresses) located in Sweden. On September 14, 2009, IPredator "The Second Batch" became available for public.

On November 28, 2009, IPredator became publicly available and exited the beta stage. This was done in response to the FRA law coming into effect on December 1, a law which would allow the FRA to intercept internet communications crossing the Swedish border. In concert, The Pirate Bay changed its logo on December 1, 2009, to an image depicting FRA as Glass Joe, the first and weakest opponent from the video game Punch-Out!!. The image linked to IPredator's website with the message "FRA vs IPredator - It's on!"

OpenVPN support was added in August 2012.

== Payment ==
In July 2013, PayPal stopped providing payment services to IPredator. In addition, all the organization's funds had been frozen for up to 180 days. The account was reinstated the next month. Conversely Paysafecard, to which many customers had switched while PayPal was unavailable, canceled support for iPredator.

== Merger ==
In October 2020, IPredator was merged into Njalla, a privacy-focused domain name and hosting service also founded by Sunde.

== See also ==
- Comparison of virtual private network services
