= Good Copy Bad Copy =

- Logo for Good Copy Bad Copy
- Directed by: Andreas Johnsen; Ralf Christensen; Henrik Moltke
- Produced by: Rosforth
- Cinematography: Andreas Johnsen; Ralf Christensen; Henrik Moltke
- Edited by: Adam Neilsen
- Music by: RJD2; Track72; Phoenicia; John Tejada; REQ; Shex; Santogold; Rex Lawson; Dr. Victor Olaiya; Pharfar; Girl Talk; Danger Mouse; Mikkel Meyer; Gnarls Barkley; De La Soul; NWA
- Release date: 2007
- Running time: 59 minutes

Good Copy Bad Copy (subtitled Good Copy Bad Copy: A documentary about the current state of copyright and culture) is a 2007 documentary film about copyright and culture in the context of Internet, peer-to-peer file sharing and other technological advances, directed by Andreas Johnsen, Ralf Christensen, and Henrik Moltke. It features interviews with many people with various perspectives on copyright, including copyright lawyers, producers, artists and filesharing service providers.

== Synopsis ==
A central point of the documentary is the thesis that "creativity itself is on the line" and that a balance needs to be struck, or that there is a conflict between protecting the right of those who own intellectual property and the rights of future generations to create.

== Content ==
Artists interviewed include Girl Talk and Danger Mouse, popular musicians of the mashup scene who cut and remix sounds from other songs into their own (notably the latter artist's The Grey Album featuring music of The Beatles and Jay Z). The interviews with these artists reveal an emerging understanding of digital works and the obstacle to their authoring copyright presents.

Good Copy Bad Copy also includes interview segments with notable copyright activist and academic Lawrence Lessig.

== Credits ==
- Girl Talk, Producer
- Dr Lawrence Ferrara, Director of Music Department NYU
- Paul V. Licalsi, Attorney Sonnenschein
- Jane Peterer, Bridgeport Music
- Dr. Siva Vaidhyanathan, NYU
- Danger Mouse, Producer
- Dan Glickman, CEO MPAA
- Gottfrid Svartholm, The Pirate Bay
- Fredrik Neij, The Pirate Bay
- Rick Falkvinge, Pirate Party
- Lawrence Lessig, Creative Commons
- Ronaldo Lemos, Professor of Law Fundação Getulio Vargas (FGV) Brazil
- Charles Igwe, Film Producer Lagos Nigeria
- Mayo Ayilaran, Musical Copyright Society Nigeria (MCSN)
- Olivier Chastan, VP Records
- John Kennedy, Chairman International Federation of the Phonographic Industry (IFPI)
- Shira Perlmutter, Head of Global Legal Policy International Federation of the Phonographic Industry (IFPI)
- Peter Jenner, Sincere Management
- John Buckman, Magnatune Records
- Beto Metralha, Producer Belém do Pará Brazil
- DJ Dinho, Tupinambá Belém do Pará Brazil

== Distribution ==
Originally created for the Danish National Broadcasting Television network, the film was eventually released for free on the internet as a BitTorrent download. The filmmakers hope that releasing Good Copy Bad Copy for free will raise awareness and lead to other local broadcasting networks to show the documentary.

The documentary first appeared on The Pirate Bay and then it was officially released under a Creative Commons Attribution-NonCommercial license on the Blip.tv video sharing site.

On 8 May 2008, Good Copy Bad Copy was shown on Swedish television station SVT2.

The documentary and an unofficial trailer are available on YouTube.

== See also ==
- Alternative compensation system
- Fair use
- Mashup (music)
- Piracy is theft
- Plunderphonics
- Remix culture
- RiP!: A Remix Manifesto
- Steal This Film
- The Internet's Own Boy
- The Pirate Bay Away From Keyboard
