= B-Reel Films =

Swedish film production company

B-Reel Films (BR•F) is an independent film and television production company based in Stockholm and Los Angeles. It was founded in 1999.

BR•F has won EFA Statuette (European Film Awards), several Cannes Lions Grand Prix, and over a dozen Swedish Academy Awards (Guldbagge Awards).

== Film & Television ==
Year	Production	Awards	Notes
2007	Darling	2 Guldbagge Named movie of the Century by DN	World premier at San Sebastian FF
2012	Palme	2 Guldbagge	
2013	Hotell	1 Guldbagge	
2014	Gentlemen	3 Guldbagge	World Premiere at TIFF
2015	Drifters (Tjuvheder)	5 Guldbagge	
2016	The Serious Game	2 Guldbagge	World premiere at Berlin FF
2017	Thelma	Critics Choice Award	Co-production
2017	Euphoria		
2018	Mannen som lekte med elden		World Premiere at Sundance
2018	Euphoria		World Premiere at TIFF
2018	Bergman: A Year in a Life	1 Guldbagge 1 EFA	World premiere at Cannes FF
2018	X&Y		
2018	Goliat	4 Guldbagge	
2018	The Man who played with Fire		Premiere at Sundance
2019	Midsommar^{[4]}		A24
2019	Hasse & Tage		
2019	The Spy		Co-production
2020	I Am Greta	1 Guldbagge 1 Kristallen	Hulu/BBC World premiere at Venice FF
2020	The Beautiful Game		
2020	Maddy the model		
2021	I am Zlatan	1 Guldbagge	World premiere at Rom FF
2021	Lena		
2021	The Worst person in the world	Nominated for 2 Oscars	Co-production
2022	Historjá	2 Guldbagge 1 Kristallen	World Premiere at GIFF
2023	Exodus		World Premiere at GIFF
2024	Debt Fever		

Television

Year	Production	Awards	Channel
2012	Beauty Inside	1 Emmy	
2017	Before We Die	2 Kristallen	SVT
2018	The man who played with Fire		TV4
2019	Before We Die Season 2		SVT
2020	Dejta		SVT
2021	Thunder In My Heart		Viaplay/Netflix
2021	Agatha Christies Hjerson		TV4/C-More
2021	The Congregation / Knutby	1 Kristallen	TV4
2022	TORE		Netflix
2022	Detective #24/Detektiven från Beledweyne		SVT
2023	Thunder in my heart Season 2	1 Kristallen	Viaplay/Netflix
2023	TORE	2 Kristallen	Netflix
2024	Helicopter Heist		Netflix
2024	The Pirate Bay		SVT
2025	The Congregation S2		TV4
