= TPB AFK =

TPB AFK: The Pirate Bay Away From Keyboard
- Promotional release poster
- Directed by: Simon Klose
- Screenplay by: Simon Klose
- Produced by: Martin Persson; Simon Klose; Signe Byrge Sørensen; Anne Köhncke; Torstein Grude
- Starring: Gottfrid Svartholm; Fredrik Neij; Peter Sunde; Roger Wallis
- Edited by: Per K. Kirkkegaard
- Music by: Ola Fløttum
- Production companies: Nonami AB, Final Cut For Real, Piraya Film AS
- Release date: 8 February 2013 (Worldwide)
- Running time: 82 minutes
- Countries: Sweden, Denmark, Norway
- Languages: Swedish; English; English (subtitles)

TPB AFK: The Pirate Bay Away From Keyboard is a 2013 Swedish documentary film directed and produced by Simon Klose. It focuses on the lives of the three founders of The Pirate Bay – Peter Sunde, Fredrik Neij, and Gottfrid Svartholm – and the Pirate Bay trial. Filming began sometime in 2008, and concluded on 28 February 2012.

== Production ==
The film's website was launched on 28 August 2010, along with a Kickstarter campaign to raise US$25,000 to hire an editor after the Court of Appeal trial. The campaign was fully funded within three days and raised $51,424 in total. In February 2011, the Swedish Arts Grants Committee (Swedish: Konstnärsnämnden) granted the project an additional 200,000 SEK (≈$30,000).

== Release ==
Trailer

The full film was released under the Creative Commons BY-NC-ND license onto The Pirate Bay, YouTube, and other BitTorrent sites. Additionally, a four-minute shorter version with certain copyright restricted content removed was released at the same time under the Creative Commons BY-NC-SA license to allow remixing.

TPB AFK premiered at the 63rd Berlin International Film Festival on 8 February 2013 – opening the festival's 'Panorama Dokumente' section – coinciding with its free online release on YouTube and The Pirate Bay.

On 19 February 2013, the film was broadcast on BBC Four in the UK as part of the BBC's Storyville documentary series.

== Reception ==
Peter Sunde, one of the subjects of the documentary, wrote that he has "mixed feelings about the movie and the release of it". Whilst he likes the technical side of the documentary, he has issues with some scenes and general attitude of the documentary; this includes too much focus put on the trial, too dark depiction of it, and portraying himself beyond self-recognition. Despite having such different views on the subject, he regards the director as a friend.

== Censorship by Hollywood ==
In May 2013, Hollywood studios – such as Viacom, Paramount, Fox and Lionsgate – started to censor Google Search links pointing to the documentary, an action criticized by Simon Klose. In June, after the initial controversy, HBO and Lionsgate sent additional DMCA takedown notices to Google requesting the removal of links related to TPB AFK. In response, Simon Klose contacted Chilling Effects, who recommended that he file a DMCA counter-notice once he had found out whether Google had taken down the links or not. Two months later, the censored links were reinstated only after public complaints made by Klose.

== See also ==
- Good Copy Bad Copy
- Piracy is theft
- May 2006 police raid of The Pirate Bay
- RiP!: A Remix Manifesto
- Steal This Film
