= Centre Democrats =

Centre Democrats may refer to:

Active parties

- Centre Democrats (Sweden)
- Union of Christian and Centre Democrats (Italy)

Former parties

- Centre Democrats (Denmark)
- Centre Democrats (Netherlands)
- Centre Democrats (San Marino)
