= Simon Klose =

Filmmaker

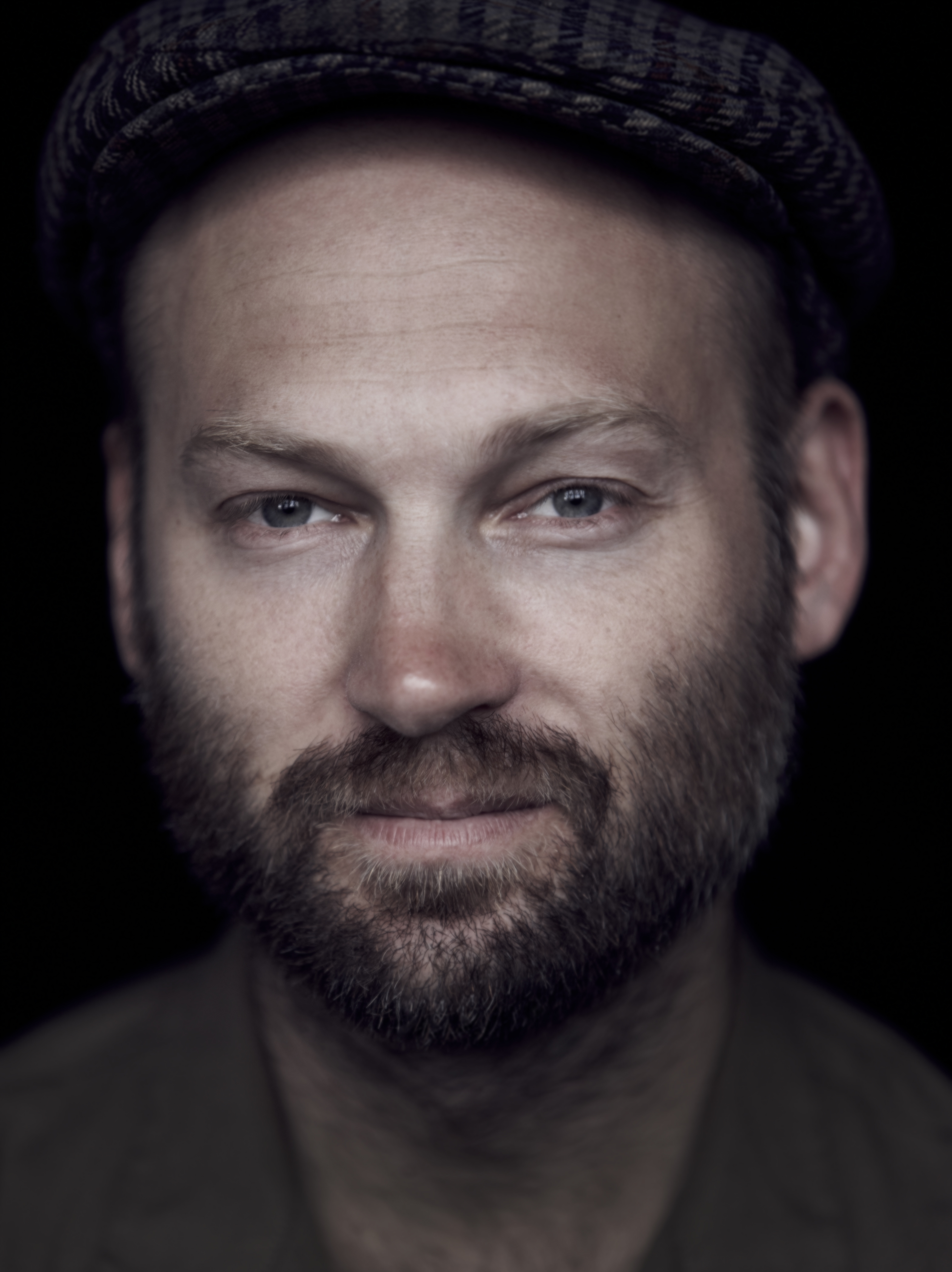

Simon Tobias Viktor Klose (born 3 September 1975 in Lund, Sweden) is a Swedish documentary and music video maker. He holds a master's degree in law from Stockholm University.

Klose has worked closely for many years with the artist Timbuktu, with whom he shared an apartment in Årsta, Stockholm, while studying law. Klose’s works include the music video for Everyone Wants to Go to Heaven but Nobody Wants to Die and the documentary film Spelberoende. Simon Klose is also behind Standard Bearer about the artist Promoe and Sweet Memories Garden Centre about two brothers from South Africa who decide to open a flower shop, co-produced by SVT in 2006.

Between 2008 and 2012, Klose worked on the documentary film ‘TPB AFK: The Pirate Bay Away From Keyboard’. In making the documentary, he followed The Pirate Bay creators, the pirate movement and the trial of The Pirate Bay. The film made history as the first film ever to open up the Berlinale and simultaneously being released for free online. It became a global viral phenomenon, propelling the story to an audience of millions of viewers.

In 2016 Simon produced and hosted “Food Hacking Japan”, a short doc TV-series for VICE Munchies on food disruptors in Tokyo.

In 2016 and 2017, Klose made several short films in collaboration with the Internet Museum. In 2016, he released The Key to the Internet, which follows, among others, security expert Anne-Marie Eklund Löwinder, who is one of 14 people in the world entrusted with the process of creating keys to protect the internet. On 13 June 2017, his short film BBS - the web before the web premiered, which, as the name suggests, depicts the Swedish BBS culture.

In 2024 Simon released his feature documentary Hacking Hate as a part of the Documentary Competition at Tribeca. The film follows investigative reporter My Vingren who goes undercover online in order to expose a network of neo-Nazis and far-right organisations that are viciously fostering hate speech and extremism on a global scale.
