= BayFiles =

File hosting service

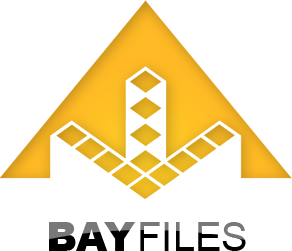

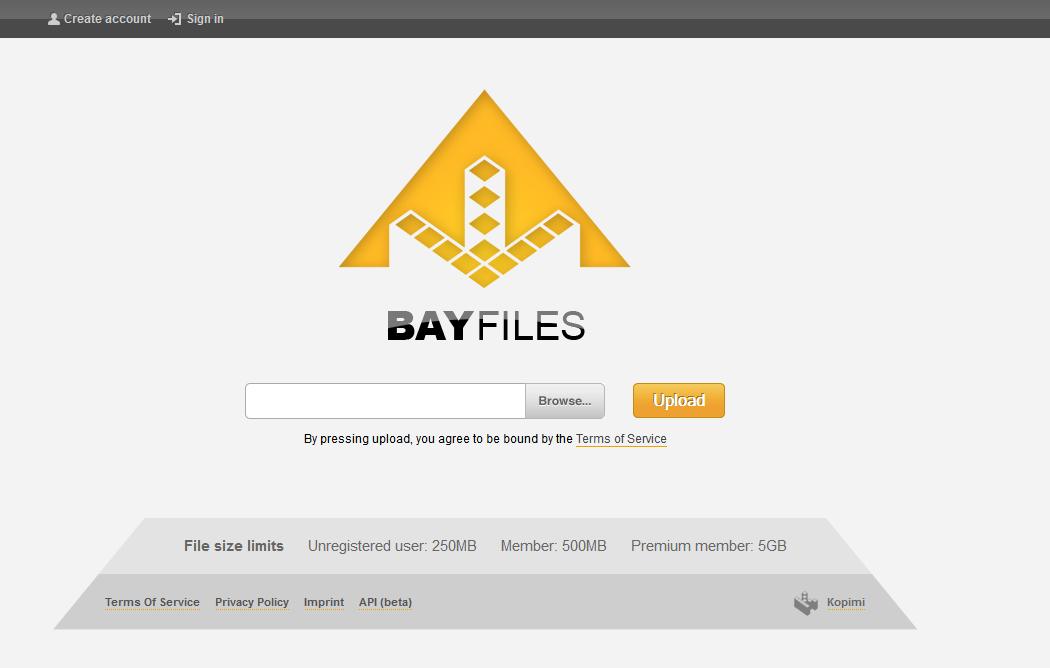
- BayFiles front page as of 22 November 2013
- Website type: One-click hosting
- Dissolved: August 16, 2023; 3 years ago
- Owner: Unknown
- Creators: Gottfrid Svartholm, Fredrik Neij
- Website: bayfiles.com
- Commercial: Ad supported
- Registration: Optional
- Launched: 2011
- Current status: Offline

BayFiles was a file-hosting website created by two of the founders of The Pirate Bay.

BayFiles works by letting users upload files to its servers and share them online. Users are provided with a link to access their files, which can be shared with anyone on the internet so that they can download the files associated with the particular link.

== Legal issues ==
One of the critical features of the BayFiles hosting service is that its founders have chosen to disallow the uploads of any content that violates third party copyright laws. This has come as a surprise to many people who are familiar with the founder's previous website The Pirate Bay, which was surrounded by legal controversy concerning copyright issues. In the website's terms of service, it asserts that it will disable the accounts of those users who frequently violate its copyright terms. BayFiles co-founder Fredrik Neij has even claimed to have hired DMCA agents who will help ensure that BayFiles is properly complying with current United States copyright law.

Despite BayFiles' goal of complying with U.S. digital copyright law, some have speculated that it will still potentially face major lawsuits because of the legal history its founders and their The Pirate Bay have had with record labels and movie studios in the past. But as long as BayFiles never explicitly promotes copyright infringement, it can maintain the legal status of its operation through relying on the precedent established in a 2010 court case won by RapidShare.

Bayfiles was shut down in November 2014. The reasons for the site's sudden disappearance are unknown, though some have indicated it was likely linked to the arrest of its sole registrant and former Pirate Bay operator Fredrik Neij.

In July 2018, the website was brought back to life, this time being run by unknown operators.

As of 10 August 2023, BayFiles went offline, the website and its uploaded files cannot be reached. BayFiles has gone offline due to the closure of parent service AnonFiles.
