= Monique Wadsted =

Swedish lawyer

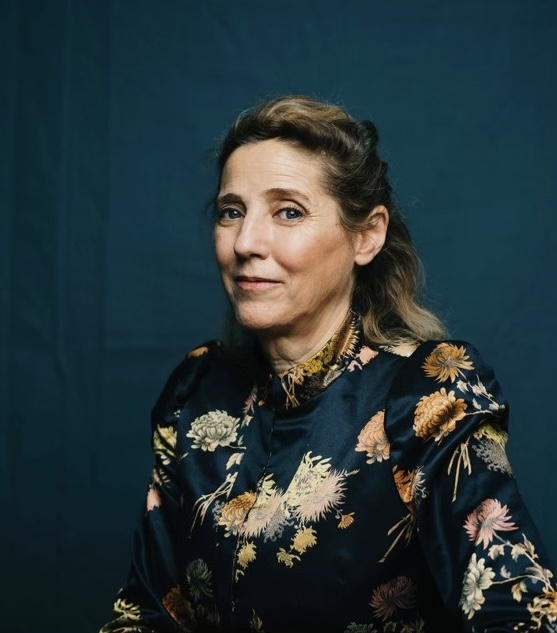
- Photo Oscar Omne
- Education: Stockholm University (LLM, 1988)
- Occupation: Lawyer/Advokat
- Employer: www.wadstedlaw.se

Monique Wadsted is a Swedish lawyer. She is a partner at Bird & Bird in Stockholm.

== Career ==
Wadsted received an LLM from Stockholm University in 1988 and clerked for the Stockholm District Court in 1989–90. Before moving to Bird & Bird, she was a partner at Magnusson Wahlin Qvist Stanbrook (MAQS) Advokatbyrå. In 2017, she was named one of the top 250 women in intellectual property law by Managing Intellectual Property.

Monique Wadsted is since 2017 included in the Hall of Fame of The Legal 500 for her work in intellectual property law and media law.

== Cases ==
She represented Swedish Match in a case regarding the borders between freedom of speech and advertising. She has also represented Duracell against Philips, KF against Gillette, Canal+ against TV1000, and Duka against Bodum.

Later she represented firms including Warner Bros., Metro-Goldwyn-Mayer, Columbia Pictures, 20th Century Fox in The Pirate Bay trial. At the trial, she argued that The Pirate Bay was not "passive" in its distribution of content. She was doxxed while the trial proceeded.

In 2014 she represented the journalist Pia Gadd in Svensson v Retriever Sverige AB, a case before the Court of Justice of the European Union regarding linking and copyright. The law in Svensson was later developed in cases such as GS Media v Sanoma.

In 2017 she represented Bringwell Sverige AB before the Supreme Court of Sweden in a case regarding damages caused by an interim injunction. The case regarded the legal basis for damages, calculation of damages and evidence of commercial loss.

In 2019 she represented the scientific publisher Elsevier by sending a cease and desist letter to the edtech company Citationsy for linking to Sci-Hub on their blog. She also represented Fredrik Virtanen in legal proceedings related to his defamation suit against Cissi Wallin.

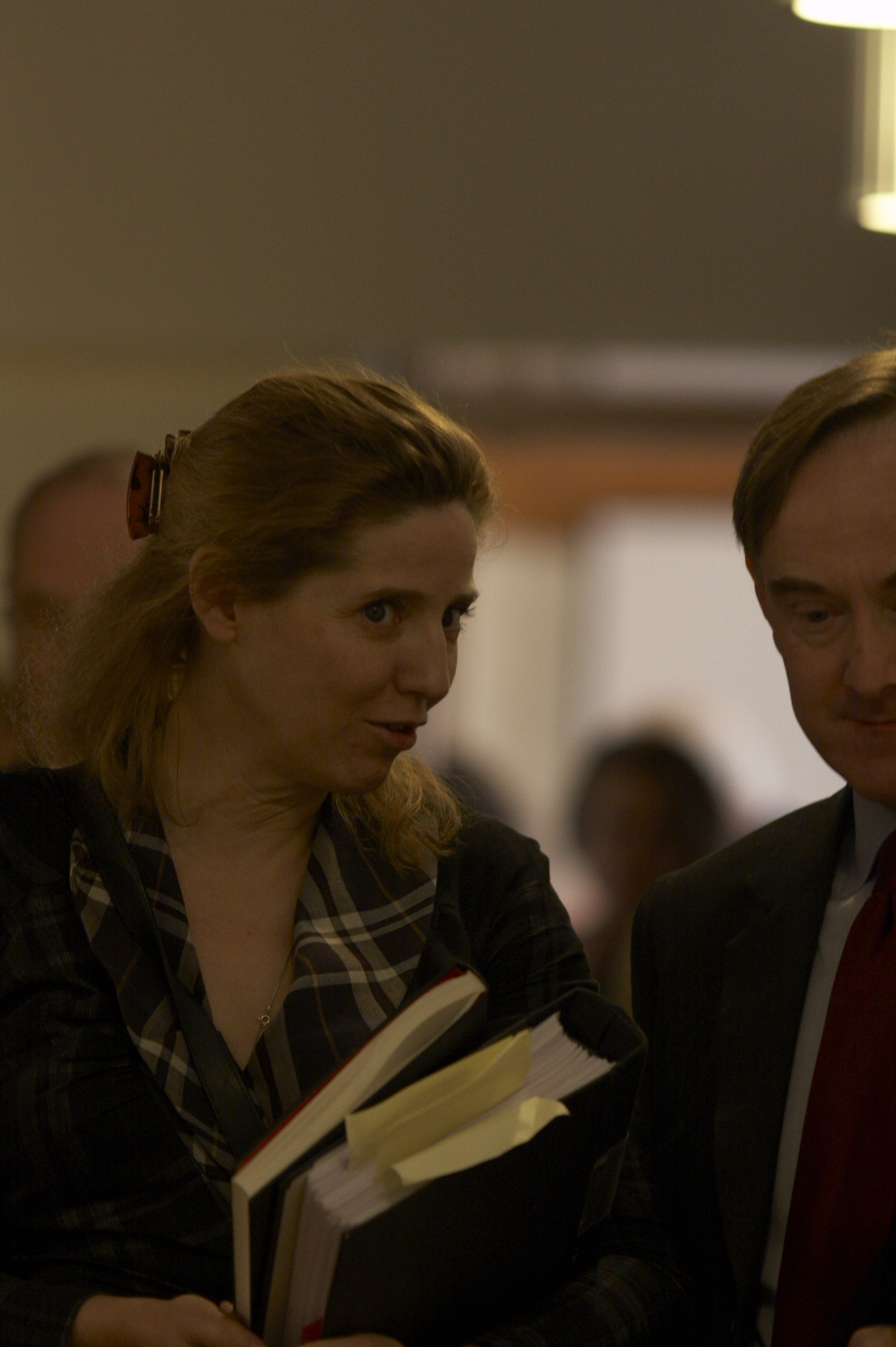
Monique Wadsted, during the Pirate Bay Trial
