= PRQ =

Swedish internet service provider

- Industry: Internet service provider
- Headquarters: Stockholm, Sweden
- Key people: Fredrik Neij and Gottfrid Svartholm
- Products: Web hosting service
- ASN: 33837
- Peering policy: Open
- Website: www.prq.se

PRQ is a Swedish Internet service provider and web hosting company created in 2004.

== Ownership ==
Based in Stockholm, PRQ was created by Gottfrid Svartholm and Fredrik Neij, two founders of The Pirate Bay.

== Business model ==
Part of PRQ's business model is to host any customers, regardless of how odd or controversial they may be. The New York Times wrote in 2008 that "The Pirate Bay guys have made a sport out of taunting all forms of authority, including the Swedish police, and PRQ has gone out of its way to be a host to sites that other companies would not touch." The PRQ service has been described as "highly secure, no-questions-asked hosting services". The company holds almost no information about its clientele and is maintaining few if any of its own logs, according to a 2008 news report. Fredrik Neij and Gottfrid Svartholm are said to have amassed "considerable expertise in withstanding legal attacks". Svartholm is quoted to have said, "We do employ our own legal staff. We are used to this sort of situation" in a telephone interview. Due to hosting The Pirate Bay, PRQ was the target of a police raid.

== Criticism ==
The co-founders have been criticized for hosting controversial websites, including web pages that promote paedophilia, such as the North American Man/Boy Love Association (NAMBLA), a paedophile and pederasty advocacy organization. Local authorities and anti-paedophilia activists in Sweden have failed to persuade PRQ to close the sites. The pair defended their decision, citing freedom of speech.

Other criticism originates from the hosting of BitTorrent website The Pirate Bay, WikiLeaks, and the French far-right blog Fdesouche.

== Legal issues ==
On 1 October 2012, PRQ was raided and a number of sites which they provided hosting for were taken offline for alleged copyright infringement.
