= Lost sales =

Revenue allegedly lost due to Internet piracy

Lost sales, also referred to as lost revenue, lost income or lost profit, is a term used in the context of Internet piracy to refer to sales that did not occur because potential customers have chosen not to buy a product but to obtain it from an illegal source for a lower cost or for no cost. Figures for lost sales usually assume that consumers who use pirated content would always choose to purchase the product at the market rate, if the illegal sources were not available.

The content industry has endorsed studies concluding that the value of lost sales amounts to billions of U.S. dollars. However, other scholars and free culture and copyleft activists argue that the industry figures are grossly inflated, because some, if not most, individuals who obtain pirated copies would not have purchased the content even if the opportunity for piracy did not exist. In other words, it is dubious whether most of the consumers of the pirated content would purchase most of it at all if they were not able to consume it for free.

== Usage of the concept ==
Representatives of the content industry such as BSA have argued that every pirated copy is a lost sale. Similar arguments have been made with regards to sales of counterfeited goods.

Estimates of lost sales commonly are given in the values of billions of U.S. dollars for the U.S. market alone, with the worldwide figures being several times higher.

== Critique ==
The concept of lost sales has been criticized, primarily due to its assumption that if illegal (pirated) copies were not available, the consumers of such a pirated copy would instead purchase the product at an average market rate. Critics of the "lost sales" concept note that some consumers, for example those in developing countries, or those with lower income such as students, may not be able to afford the market price of certain products and if there were no pirated copies available, it is likely they would simply not purchase the ones available at the market price. Others may treat pirated goods as samples that entice them to buy the product later on. It has been suggested that the better term would be "retail value of pirated [goods]", and that equating such a concept with financial loss is fallacious. Treating each pirated copy as a lost sale, and using an estimate for the number of pirated copies in existence, multiplied by their retail value, as tangible loss of profits by the industry has been called disparagingly "copyright math" (a term coined by writer Robert Reid) that leads to overestimation of the content industry losses. In academic literature there is no consensus that the concept of piracy is clearly correlated with reduction of revenue of sales of the pirated product, and estimates of lost sales have been similarly criticized, with a 2010 U.S. government report noting that many commonly cited figures cannot be substantiated. Similarly, estimates of lost sales translated to concepts such as lost jobs or reduction in individual or national incomes have been shown to be highly problematic.

A 2009 court case, United States v. Dove, ruled that the content industry equation of lost sales with illegal downloads is not valid, with the judge noting "Those who download movies and music for free would not necessarily purchase those movies and music at the full purchase price... although it is true that someone who copies a digital version of a sound recording has little incentive to purchase the recording through legitimate means, it does not necessarily follow that the downloader would have made a legitimate purchase if the recording had not been available for free."

In 2015 Peter Sunde (co-founder of Pirate Bay) created a device called Kopimashin to "show the absurdity on the process of putting a value to a copy". A similar project called "Strata Kazika" was already launched by Polish activists in 2012.

== See also ==
- Budget constraint
- lucrum cessans
- Opportunity cost
