= Peter Sunde =

Swedish entrepreneur and politician (born 1978)

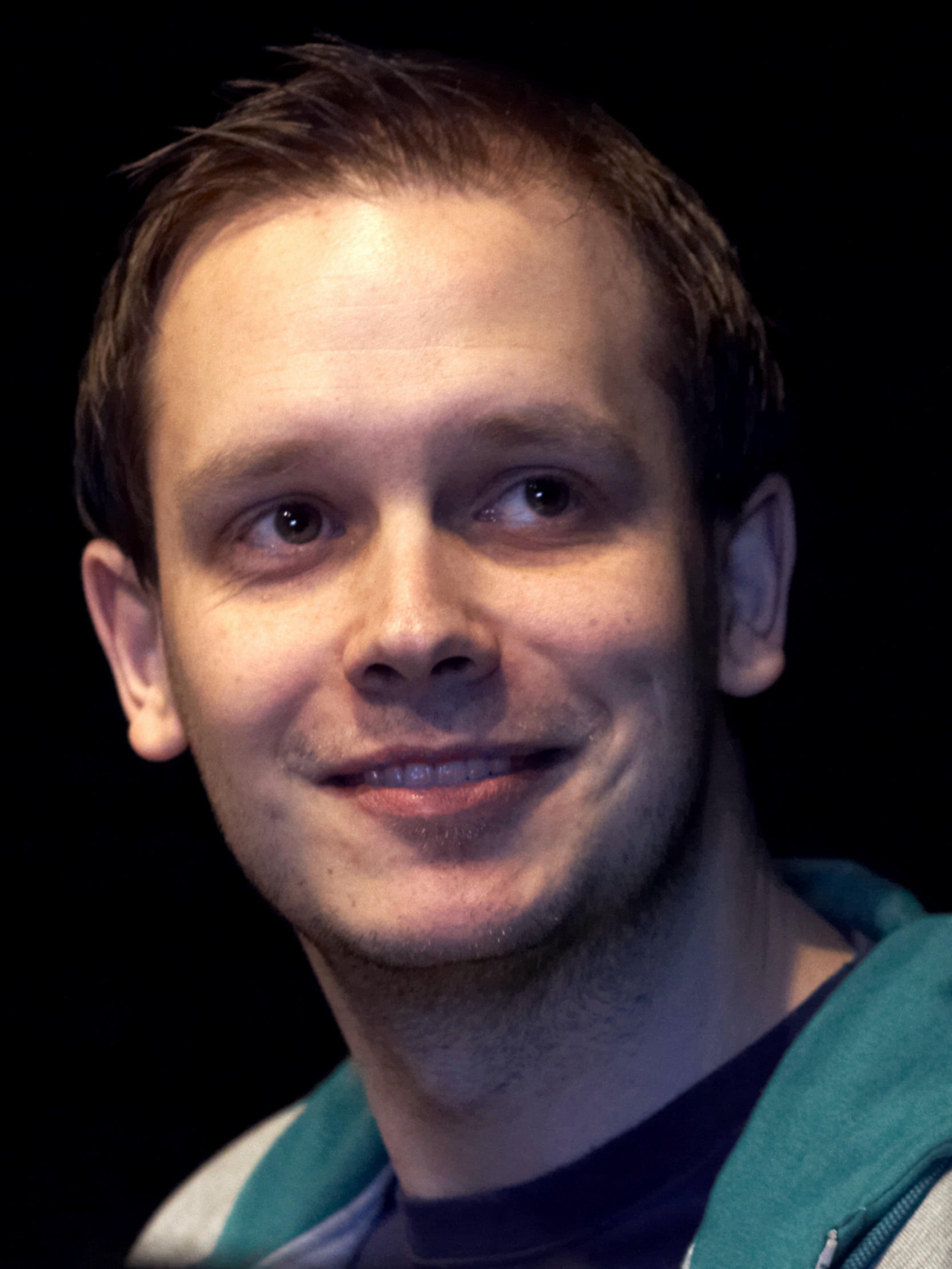
- Sunde in 2009
- Born: Peter Sunde Kolmisoppi; 13 September 1978 (age 48); Uddevalla, Sweden
- Other name: brokep
- Occupations: Politician, spokesperson
- Known for: Co-founder of The Pirate Bay; Founder of Flattr; Co-founder of Kvittar; Co-founder of IPredator; Founder of Njalla
- Political party: Pirate

Peter Sunde Kolmisoppi (born 13 September 1978), alias brokep, is a Swedish-born Finnish-Norwegian entrepreneur and politician. He is best known for being a co-founder and ex-spokesperson of The Pirate Bay, a BitTorrent search engine. He is an equality advocate and has expressed concerns over issues of centralization of power to the European Union in his blog. Sunde also participates in the Pirate Party of Finland and describes himself as a socialist. In April 2017, Sunde founded Njalla, a privacy oriented domain name registrar, hosting provider and VPN provider.

== Personal life ==
Sunde is of Norwegian and Finnish ancestry. Before the founding of the Pirate Bay, Sunde worked for Siemens. In 2003, he became a member of Sweden's Piratbyrån (The Pirate Bureau) and a few months later Sunde, Fredrik Neij and Gottfrid Svartholm started The Pirate Bay with Sunde as the spokesperson. He remained The Pirate Bay's spokesperson until late 2009 (three years after the ownership of the site transferred to Reservella). In August 2011, Sunde and fellow Pirate Bay co-founder Fredrik Neij launched file-sharing site BayFiles, that aimed to legally share. Sunde is vegan and speaks Swedish, Finnish, Norwegian, English and German.

Peter Sunde ran for European Parliament in 2014 election with the Pirate Party of Finland.

On 31 May 2014, just days after the EU elections and exactly eight years after the police raided The Pirate Bay servers, Sunde was arrested at a farm in Oxie, Malmö to serve his prison sentence for the Pirate Bay case. He was released five months later after having served two-thirds of his eight-month sentence.

== The Pirate Bay trial ==
On 31 January 2008, The Pirate Bay operators – Sunde, Fredrik Neij, Gottfrid Svartholm and Carl Lundström (CEO of The Pirate Bay's former ISP) – were charged with "assisting [others in] copyright infringement". The trial began on 16 February 2009. On 17 April 2009, in Stockholm District Court, Sunde and his co-defendants were judged guilty of "assisting in making copyright content available". Each defendant was sentenced to one year in prison and ordered to pay damages of 30 million SEK (approximately €2,712,300 or US$3,018,000), to be apportioned among the four defendants. After the verdict a press conference was held where Sunde held up a handwritten IOU statement claiming that is all the damages he will pay, adding "Even if I had any money I would rather burn everything I own and not even give them the ashes. They could have the job of picking them up. That's how much I hate the media industry."

The defendants' lawyers appealed to the Svea Court of Appeal together with a request for a retrial in the district court claiming bias on the part of judge Tomas Norström. The court ruled there was no bias and denied the request for a retrial.

On appeal, the jail sentences were reduced, but the damages increased.

The supreme court of Sweden subsequently refused to hear any further appeal.

The European Court of Human Rights also later rejected an appeal.

Segments of an interview with Sunde talking about copyright, the Internet, and culture are featured in the 2007 documentary Steal This Film and 2013 documentary TPB AFK.

The early days of The Pirate Bay, along with the trial, are the basis for the 2024 series The Pirate Bay, with the role of Peter Sunde played by actor Simon Gregor Carlsson. The series was broadcast on the SVT network, a public television network funded by Swedish taxpayers, modelled on the BBC.

== Flattr ==
Flattr was a micropayments system started by Sunde and Linus Olsson, which enabled viewers of websites to make small donations to the developer by clicking a "Flattr this" button. At the time of the projects's announcement in February 2010, Sunde explained that "the money you pay each month will be spread evenly among the buttons you click in a month. We want to encourage people to share money as well as content." Flattr itself took a 10% administration fee.

After WikiLeaks' initial publication of the U.S. Diplomatic Cables, companies including Visa, MasterCard, PayPal and Moneybookers blocked donations and money transfers to the site. Flattr, however, continued allowing donations to WikiLeaks. Sunde commented "We [Flattr] think their work is exactly what is needed and if we can help just a little bit, we will."

On 5 April 2017, Adblock Plus publisher Eyeo GmbH announced that it had acquired Flattr for an undisclosed amount.

== Hemlis ==
On 9 July 2013, Peter Sunde, together with Leif Högberg and Linus Olsson, announced a fundraising campaign for Hemlis. Their goal was to launch a mass market messenger that was secure and private.

On 22 April 2015, the Hemlis team announced that they were discontinuing the development of the Hemlis messaging platform.

== Kopimashin ==
On 14 December 2015, Sunde released a video on his Vimeo account of a device called "Kopimashin", a machine made with a Raspberry Pi running a Python routine to produce 100 copies per second of Gnarls Barkley's single "Crazy", redirecting the copies to /dev/null (where the data is discarded), surpassing eight million copies per day.

The following day, Sunde published the full description of the device and project at Konsthack as the first art project of the site's portfolio.

The machine has an LCD screen (as shown in the video) that calculates a running tally of the damages it has supposedly inflicted upon the record industry through its use, accordingly to what RIAA claims on their website. If RIAA's claims were valid, it also meant that the record industry would soon become bankrupt as a result of Kopimashin, a claim the project seeks to disprove with a physical example.

A few days later, Sunde told news site TorrentFreak that Kopimashin was created to "show the absurdity on the process of putting a value to a copy", and that "putting a price to a copy is futile."

A similar project called "Strata Kazika" was already launched by Polish activists in 2012.

== See also ==
- Alexandra Elbakyan
- Sci-Hub
- Library Genesis
- Lost sales
