= Progress Party (Sweden) =

Swedish political party

The Progress Party (Swedish: Framstegspartiet, FsP), later the Swedish Progress Party (Swedish: Framstegspartiet, FsP) was a minor Swedish political party that existed in various forms from 1968 to the 2000s, when local parties merged with the Sweden Democrats, or developed into distinct local parties. It was based mostly in Scania, although it at times had active local chapters in other places. For a time, it saw itself as a Swedish equivalent of the Progress Party in Denmark and Progress Party in Norway.

== Early years ==
The party was founded on 6 November 1968 by Bertil Rubin, a former Member of Parliament for the Centre Party, and the remains of the minor parties Medborgerlig samling and Samling för framsteg. The party soon had 10,000 members and planned to run for the 1970 general election, but it failed because of economic problems. The party won only three mandates in Klippan and was practically dissolved as a national party following the defeat. The party lost all its mandates in Klippan after the 1973 local elections and was largely just active in the municipality of Motala through the 1970s.

The party was refounded at a party congress in Norrköping in 1979, with Nils Lindgren of Motala as party chairman. The party for the first time ran in an election with a national list. In 1979 and 1980, the party was visited by Mogens Glistrup of the Danish Progress Party and evolved into an outspokenly right-wing populist party through the 1980s, inspired by him. For the 1982 general election, the party changed its name to the Swedish Progress Party under the new chairman Stefan Herrmann, with chapters in Motala and Stockholm. Stickers then included messages such as "AIDS comes from abroad", "the woman back to the stove" and "let the booze free". In the 1988 general election, the party had its strongest base in Östergötland.

== Two Progress parties ==
The Swedish Progress Party was founded as a national party in a congress in Helsingborg on 11 March 1989. The party then added to its base defectors from the Centre Democrats in Scania, Mittpartiet in Ånge, Löntagarepartiet in Åstorp and Kommunens Väl in Skurup. Tony Wiklander of Löntagarepartiet was elected as new party chairman, an established local politician in Åstorp with a history in the Left Party and the Social Democrats.

By 1990, the party claimed 2,000 members in twenty chapters around the country. However, Wiklander was expelled as chairman in June due to comments in the media that were seen as too extreme and his connections with the early Sweden Democrats and the New Swedish Movement. Wiklander then chose to establish a new party with the old Progress Party name in October the same year, with economic support from millionaire Carl Lundström. In the electoral campaign for the 1991 general election, Wiklander's party claimed that Swedes would become "a minority in their own country around the year 2055". In the general election, both parties won six mandates in municipalities in southern Sweden and Wiklander's party had become the most important local party in southern Sweden. In Åstorp, Wiklander's party started a cooperation with New Democracy and an immigration-skeptical faction of the Social Democrats.

As New Democracy emerged with similar policies, this led the primary financier of the Progress Party, Carl Lundström, to change his support to New Democracy. The Helsingborg chapter of the party then reshaped itself into Svensk Samling which merged into the Sweden Democrats in 1998. Later, most of the leaders joined the National Democrats when that party was formed from the split of the Sweden Democrats in 2001.

Most municipal chapters, including that of party leader Tony Wiklander's in Åstorp, waited until after the split of the Sweden Democrats in 2001 and thereafter merged with the Sweden Democrats, the more moderate faction. In Åstorp, Kommunens framtid was formed in January 2002 as a replacement for the Progress Party for the 2002 general election. By 1997, the Progress Party had likely no more than 300 members.

A local Progress Party was founded in Bjuv in March 2000, gaining two seats in the municipality in the 2002 local elections. Allan Jönsson was the party chairman from the start and was turned into a local Sweden Democrats chapter before the 2006 general election.

== Election results ==
=== Local representation ===
In the 1970 general election, the party received three mandates in Klippan. In the 1985 general election, the party received one mandate in Motala. In the 1991 general election, the party received three mandates in Landskrona, two in Helsingborg.

In the 1994 general election, the party received one mandate in Bjuv, two in Landskrona, two in Markaryd and two in Åstorp. In the 1998 general election, the party received two mandates in Bjuv, four in Landskrona and one in Åstorp. In the 2002 general election, the party received two mandates in Bjuv.

== Party chairmen ==
=== Swedish Progress Party ===
- Bertil Rubin (1968–1979)
- Nils Lundgren (1979–1982)
- Stefan Herrmann (1982–1987)
- Nils Lundgren (1987–1989)
- Tony Wiklander (1989–1990)
- Ulf Sundholm (1990–1992)
- Carl-Eric Samuelsson (1992–1996)

=== Progress Party ===
- Tony Wiklander (1990–2001)
