= Njalla =

Anonymous domain registrar, hosting and VPN provider

- Founded: 2018; 8 years ago
- Founder: Peter Sunde
- Services: Domain and Internet Hosting
- Website: njal.la; njallalafimoej5i4eg7vlnqjvmb6zhdh27qxcatdn647jtwwwui3nad.onion ^{(Accessing link help)}

Njalla (Swedish pronunciation: [ˈnjala]) is an anonymous domain name registrar, hosting provider and VPN provider, established by The Pirate Bay co-founder Peter Sunde.

== History ==
Peter Sunde started the company in 2017 as a middle man between domain registration and registrants in order to provide anonymity. Per his own account, he does not own a stake in the business.

In 2018, Njalla was singled out in a complaint to the Japanese government about domain privacy services by the Content Overseas Distribution Association, a national anti-piracy industry trade group, which cited the use of Njalla's services by the defunct piracy website Mangamura.

In November 2020, towards the end of the first presidency of Donald Trump, the Recording Industry Association of America (RIAA) and the Music Publishers Association (MPA) nominated Njalla as a "notorious market" to the United States Trade Representative for offering privacy protection to domain name registrants. In response, Sunde pointed out that the RIAA and the MPA had previously complained about the European Union's General Data Protection Regulation, which he described as a "Njalla-Light". He wrote a letter to the USTR in which he denounced "a frontal attack on the lobbying efforts by wealthy organizations that are trying to control the Internet" and "putting our global democracy in jeopardy", and alluded to the spread of "fake news and trolls as presidents".

In December 2023, the Swedish far-right activist Christian Peterson alleged that Sunde was hosting the website of the Swedish Antifascistisk Aktion while at the same time making money from child pornography through Njalla. Peterson had started his "Defamation Ombudsman" right-extremist project targeting left-wing journalists and opinion leaders with civil lawsuits earlier that year.

In May 2025, the European Commission added Njalla to its counterfeit and piracy watch list, alleging that the company offered "piracy as a service". TorrentFreak reported that the allegation was erroneous and taken verbatim from a 2024 submission to the USTR by the MPA, which had coined the concept of "piracy as a service" in its previous report of 2021.

In November 2025, Christian Peterson, now a close associate of Sweden Democrats politician Kent Ekeroth, used his Substack channel to target Njalla with a call on "European authorities" to "ban Antifa structures, as the United States has done, and dismantle the digital networks that allow them to operate in the shadows", while claiming to have "alerted the Trump administration to the anti-fascist circles in Sweden".

In January 2026, Njalla apparently stopped providing domain name registrar services to the popular shadow library Sci-Hub.
