= Pia Gadd =

Swedish journalist and author (born 1945)

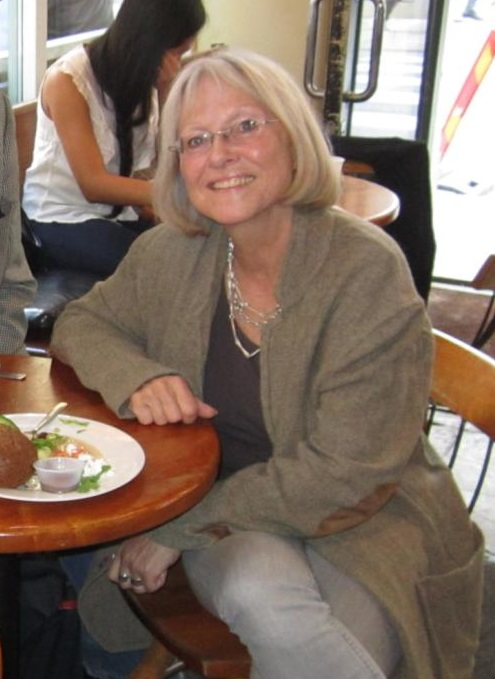
Pia Gadd

Christina Pia Gadd (born 11 July 1945) is a Swedish journalist and author. She has been a journalist at Expressen newspaper in Gothenburg from 1981 to 1990, she has since been a freelance journalist, radio producer and author who has published several books.

== Bibliography ==
- Att aldrig gå loss. Interview with Clark Olofsson.Carlssons 1991
- Mord, Blod, Moral. Carlssons 1994
- En tillräckligt vacker dag för att dö. Bonnier Alba 1994
- Mat i myt och historia. Carlssons 2001
- Vett och etikett i affärslivet. Ekerlids förlag 2002
- Frillor, fruar och herrar – en okänd kvinnohistoria. Fischer & Co 2009
- Domstolen. En nämndemans betraktelser. Dialogos 2017
