= Gottfrid Svartholm =

Swedish computer specialist (born 1984)

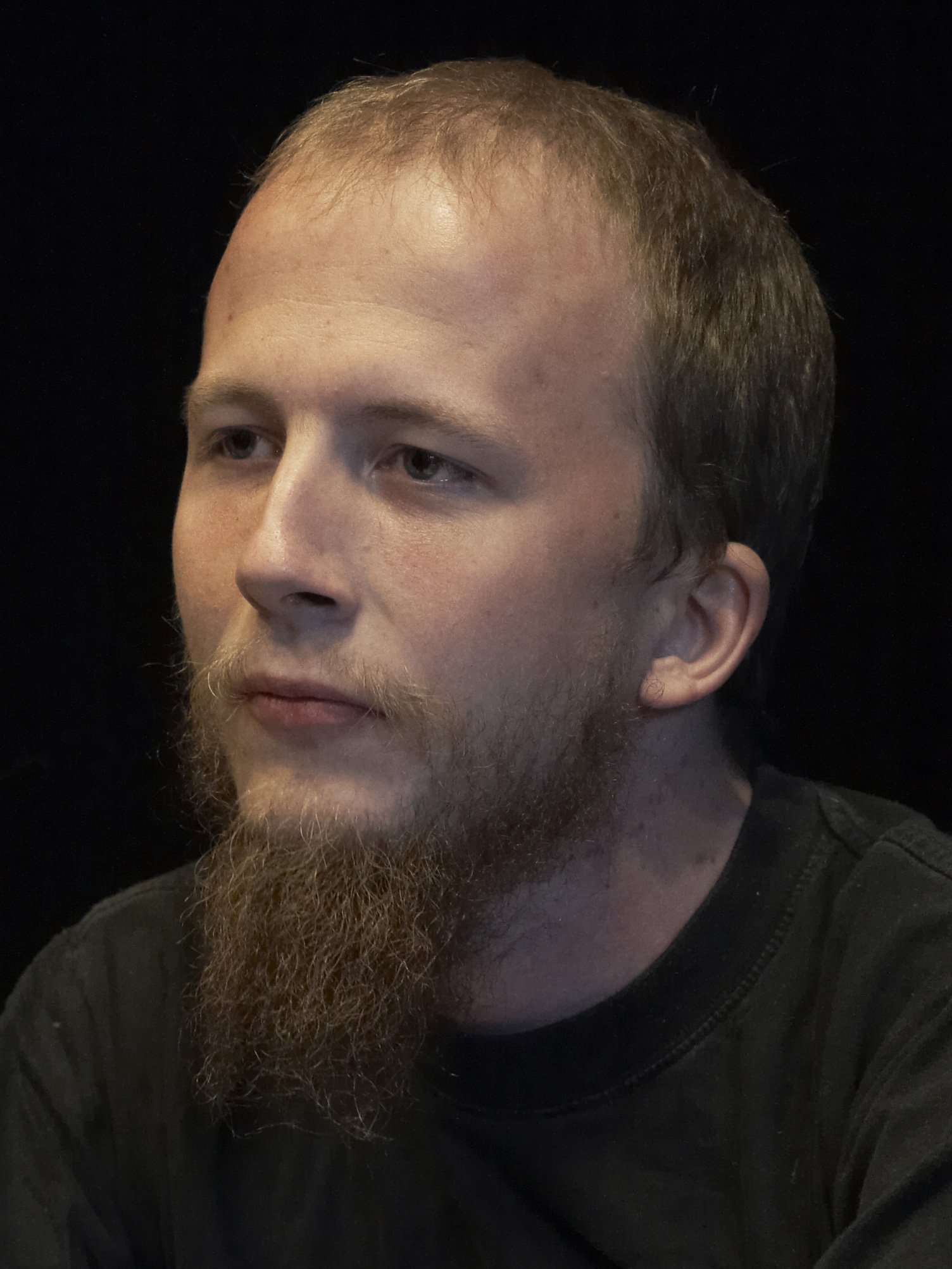
- Svartholm in 2009
- Born: Per Gottfrid Svartholm Warg; 17 October 1984 (age 42); Stockholm, Sweden
- Other name: anakata
- Occupation: Computer specialist
- Known for: Co-founding The Pirate Bay
- Political party: Classical Liberal

Per Gottfrid Svartholm Warg (born 17 October 1984), alias anakata, is a Swedish computer specialist, known as the former co-owner of the web hosting company PRQ and co-founder of the BitTorrent site The Pirate Bay together with Fredrik Neij and Peter Sunde.

Parts of an interview with Svartholm commenting on the May 2006 police raid of The Pirate Bay are featured in Good Copy Bad Copy and Steal This Film. He is a main focus of the documentary TPB AFK.

In May 2013, WikiLeaks said Svartholm had worked with the organization for the 2010 release of Collateral Murder, the helicopter cockpit gunsight video of a July 2007 airstrike by U.S. forces in Baghdad. According to WikiLeaks, Svartholm served as technical consultant and managed infrastructure critical to the organization. He was also listed as part of the "decryption and transmission team" and credited for "networking." Svartholm was one of several Pirate Bay associates who did work for other Wikileaks endeavors. One of Svartholm's companies had previously hosted WikiLeaks' computers.

On 27 November 2013, he was extradited to Denmark, where he was charged with infiltrating the Danish social security database, driver's licence database, and the shared IT system used in the Schengen zone. Awaiting his court trial, he was being held in solitary confinement. A court trial ended on 31 October 2014, and he was found guilty by the jury and was sentenced to three and a half years in prison. The sentence was appealed immediately, but the judges, fearing that he might try to evade his sentence, ordered that he be held in confinement until the appeal court trial date. After spending three years in different prisons in both Sweden and Denmark, he was released on 29 September 2015.

== Americas Dumbest Soldiers and meeting Fredrik Neij ==
Svartholm started the website Americas Dumbest Soldiers which listed deceased US soldiers in the Iraq War and asked users of the site to rate how "dumb" the soldiers were based on how they died. Fredrik Neij provided Svartholm's website access to the internet via British Telecom. According to Neij, someone at the US State Department contacted the head of British Telecom, who in turn contacted the head of the Swedish provider which Neij worked for, who then asked Svartholm and Neij to remove the site. Invoking freedom of speech and parody laws, Svartholm and Neij questioned the request but eventually removed the site.

== The Pirate Bay ==
Svartholm co-founded The Pirate Bay in 2003 with Fredrik Neij and Peter Sunde. At the time, it was part of the Swedish anti-copyright group and think tank Piratbyrån and became a platform for sharing audio, video, software and electronic games. According to Svartholm, Piratbyrån was mainly involved with political operations such as rallies, petitions and lobbying for changes to copyright law, while The Pirate Bay's stated goal is to "help people freely exchange information".

Svartholm also created the BitTorrent tracker software Hypercube (which is open source software under no specific license) which was used to run The Pirate Bay website.

=== Legal issues ===
Court video of Svartholm recount how he started The Pirate Bay.

The Swedish police first raided The Pirate Bay on 31 May 2006 on suspicion that it operated as a business infringing on copyrights. The police confiscated servers and questioned its administrators including Svartholm. On 31 January 2008, The Pirate Bay operators – Peter Sunde, Fredrik Neij, Svartholm and Carl Lundström (CEO of The Pirate Bay's former Internet service provider) – were charged with "promoting other people's infringements of copyright laws". The trial began on 16 February 2009. Svartholm, along with Neij and Lundström, defended Piratebay by arguing that they did not profit from piracy since users were not charged for its services and merely relied on website advertising as their source of revenue. On 17 April 2009, Sunde and his co-defendants were found to be guilty of "assisting in making copyright content available" in the Stockholm District Court. Each defendant was sentenced to one year in prison and they were ordered to pay damages of 30 million SEK (approximately €3,390,317 or US$4,222,980), to be apportioned among the four defendants. The defendants' lawyers have appealed to the Svea Court of Appeal together with a request for a retrial in the district court because of a recent suspicion of bias by judge Tomas Norström. Under Swedish law, the verdict is not lawful until all appeals have been processed.

In April 2009, Svartholm was the subject of an investigation by Swedish prosecutors looking into his role in The Student Bay, a file sharing site specializing in academic texts. Svartholm claimed he had no knowledge of the site. The site was reported by the Swedish Association for Educational Writers in December 2008 claiming it violated copyright law.

In October 2009, Stockholm District Court ordered that Svartholm be banned from operating The Pirate Bay, despite the fact that he was not living in Sweden and that The Pirate Bay was no longer located in the country.

== Arrest in Cambodia ==
On 30 August 2012, at the request of Swedish authorities, Svartholm was arrested by Cambodian police in the capital Phnom Penh, where he had been living for several years. Cambodia has no extradition treaty with Sweden, but Cambodian police spokesman Kirth Chantharith told the AFP news agency "we'll look into our laws and see how we can handle this case". Subsequently, Cambodian police were reportedly stating that the Swedish government had requested that Svartholm be deported in connection with "a crime related to information technology".

Torrentfreak speculated that Svartholm's arrest may have been connected to a 400 million kronor (at the time, approximately US$59M) two-year "democratic development, human rights, education and climate change" grant from the Swedish government to the Cambodian government. The grant was announced on 5 September 2012.

Svartholm was eventually deported back to Sweden. He has also been investigated for two alleged instances of hacking, including breaking into the Swedish tax office between 2010 and April 2012, and is also suspected of serious fraud. The latter of which he was convicted of and charged with, given a 2-year prison sentence which was served in the prison located in Mariefred.

In June 2013 Svartholm was named as a suspect in a Danish case, where millions of personal identification numbers were stolen from a police database. Danish police asked that Svartholm be extradited from Sweden, so that he can be tried in Denmark. Svartholm was extradited to Denmark, to undergo a similar trial as the one in Sweden, the timing of which is dependent on the outcome in Sweden. On 20 June 2013, Svartholm was found guilty of hacking and sentenced to two years in prison. This two-year prison sentence was eventually reduced to one year by appeal. According to his mother, he expressed a desire 'to get back to his developmental work within IT' upon his release.
