= Centre Democrats (Sweden) =

Swedish political party

Centre Democrats Centrumdemokraterna
- Abbreviation: CD
- Leader: Harry Franzén (last)
- Founder: John Görnebrand
- Founded: June 1974
- Dissolved: after September 2006
- Split from: Centre Party
- Ideology: Right-wing populism
- Political position: Right-wing
- Colours: Yellow; Black
- Slogan: «For a freer Sweden» (Swedish: «För ett friare Sverige»)

Website
- www.centrumdemokraterna.nu (archived)

The Centre Democrats (Swedish: Centrumdemokraterna) was a minor political party in Sweden, founded in 1974. While the party has described itself as a "centre alternative", it has been described externally as a right-wing populist party. It agitated against immigration from the 1980s, but toned down the issue in the 2000s, focusing more on local, social and economic issues. The party had some local representation from the 1970s, until 2006, when it lost its final local seat.

== History ==
The party was founded in June 1974 by the lead of John Görnebrand of Simrishamn as an alliance of multiple local parties in Scania. It was mainly modeled after the Danish Centre Democrats, including influences from Mogens Glistrup and his Progress Party. The party won several local municipal seats in elections during the 1970s and 1980s, and was even represented in the municipal government in Båstad in a cooperation with the Moderate Party after the 1979 election. Before the 1982 election, Harry Franzén was elected as new party chairman, and the party started to focus considerably more on immigration issues. The party began speaking against immigrant native language education and called the refugee policy a "travel agency mafia" for refugees. During the refugee controversy in Sjöbo, the party supported the side of Sven-Olle Olsson.

Right after the 1988 election, the Centre Democrats split in two factions, led by Harry Franzén and John Nielsen. Nielsen broke away in early 1989 with the local Svedala chapter, and turned it into a local chapter of the Progress Party. By the 1991 election, he had however gone back to the Centre Democrats. In turn, many leading members of the Centre Democrats went over to New Democracy by the same election. By 1997, the party had just around 300 members. For the 2006 election the party lost its final local representation, a seat it had held in Svalöv.

== Election results ==
=== Local representation ===
Election	Municipality					Ref.
Election	Simrishamn	Båstad	Rättvik	Svalöv	Svedala	Ref.
1976	2	2	0	0	0	
1979	4	3	1	4	0	
1982	3	0	0	0	0	
1985	2	0	0	0	0	
1988	3	1	0	0	2	
1991	6	0	0	4	0	
1994	5	0	0	3	0	
1998	5	0	0	3	0	
2002	0	0	0	1	0	
2006	0	0	0	0	0	

== Party chairmen ==
- John Görnebrand (1974–1982)
- Harry Franzén (1982–2006)
