= The Pirate Bay trial =

Copyright infringement trial of torrent tracker

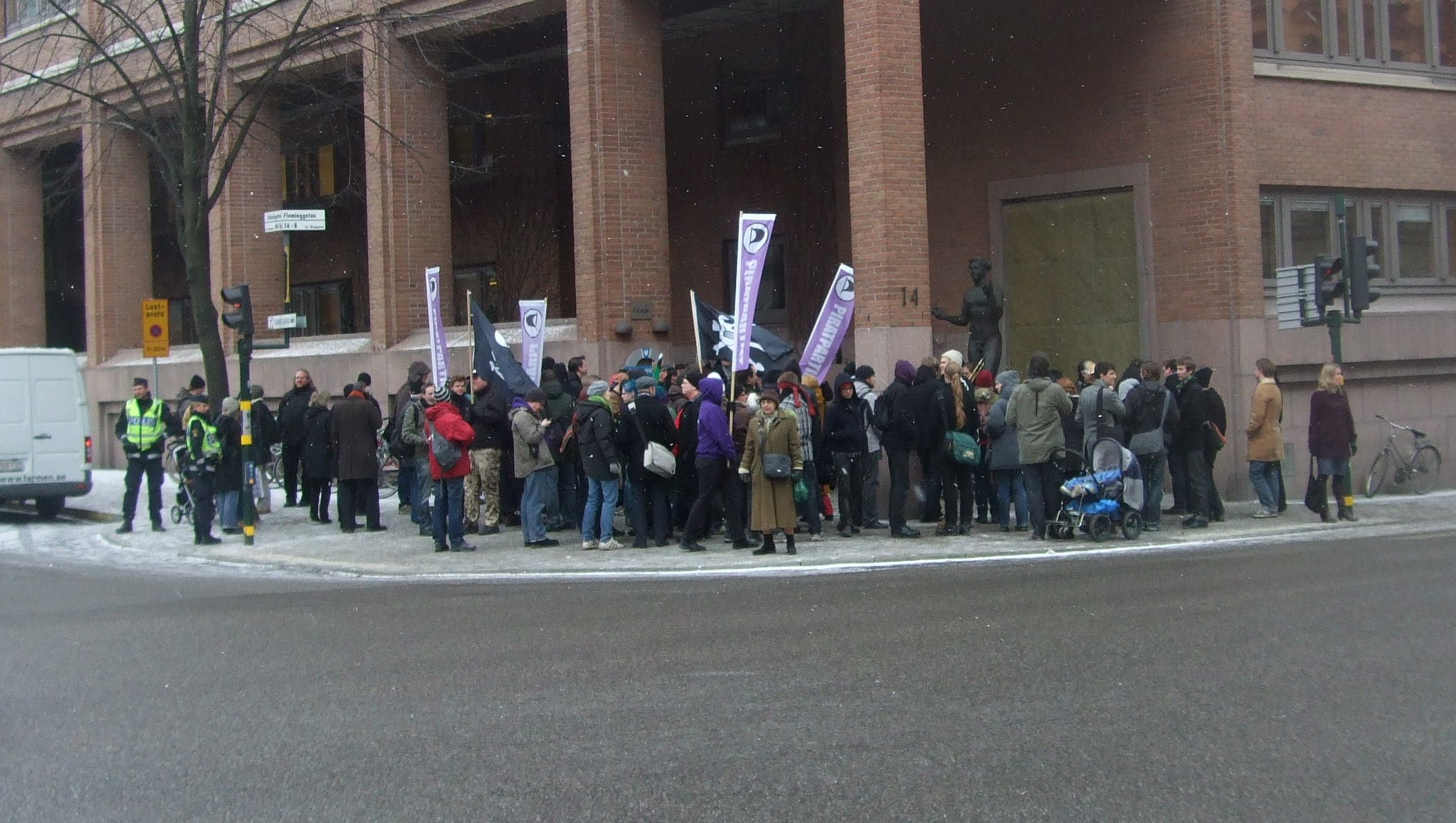
- Protesters showing support for The Pirate Bay on the first day of the trial.
- Court: Stockholm District Court, Sweden
- Full case name: B 13301-06
- Decided: 17 April 2009

Court membership
- Judge sitting: Tomas Norström

The Pirate Bay trial was a joint criminal and civil prosecution in Sweden of four individuals charged for promoting the copyright infringement of others with the torrent tracking website The Pirate Bay. The criminal charges were supported by a consortium of intellectual rights holders led by the Motion Picture Association and the International Federation of the Phonographic Industry (IFPI), who filed individual civil compensation claims against the owners of The Pirate Bay.

Swedish prosecutors filed charges on 31 January 2008 against Fredrik Neij, Gottfrid Svartholm, and Peter Sunde, who ran the site; and Carl Lundström, a Swedish businessman who through his businesses sold services to the site. The prosecutor claimed the four worked together to administer, host, and develop the site and thereby facilitated other people's breach of copyright law. Some 34 cases of copyright infringements were originally listed, of which 21 were related to music files, nine to movies, and four to games. One case involving music files was later dropped by the copyright holder who made the file available again on the website of The Pirate Bay. In addition, claims for damages of 117 million kronor (US$13 million) were filed. The case was decided jointly by a professional judge and three appointed lay judges.

The trial started on 16 February 2009 in the Stockholm District Court, Sweden. The hearings ended on 3 March 2009 and the verdict was announced on Friday 17 April 2009: Peter Sunde, Fredrik Neij, Gottfrid Svartholm and Carl Lundström were all found guilty and sentenced to one year imprisonment and pay a fine of 30 million SEK (about €2.7 million or US$3.5 million). All the defendants appealed the verdict, and in November 2010 the appeal court shortened the prison sentences, but increased damages.

On 1 February 2012, the Supreme Court of Sweden refused to hear an appeal in the case, prompting the site to change its official domain name from thepiratebay.org to thepiratebay.se.

== Background ==
The Pirate Bay is a Swedish website that indexes and tracks BitTorrent files. It bills itself as "the galaxy's largest BitTorrent tracker" and is ranked as the 73rd most popular website by Alexa Internet. The website is funded primarily with advertisements shown next to torrent listings. Initially established in September 2003 by the Swedish anti-copyright organization Piratbyrån ("The Piracy Bureau") it has been operating as a separate organization since October 2004.

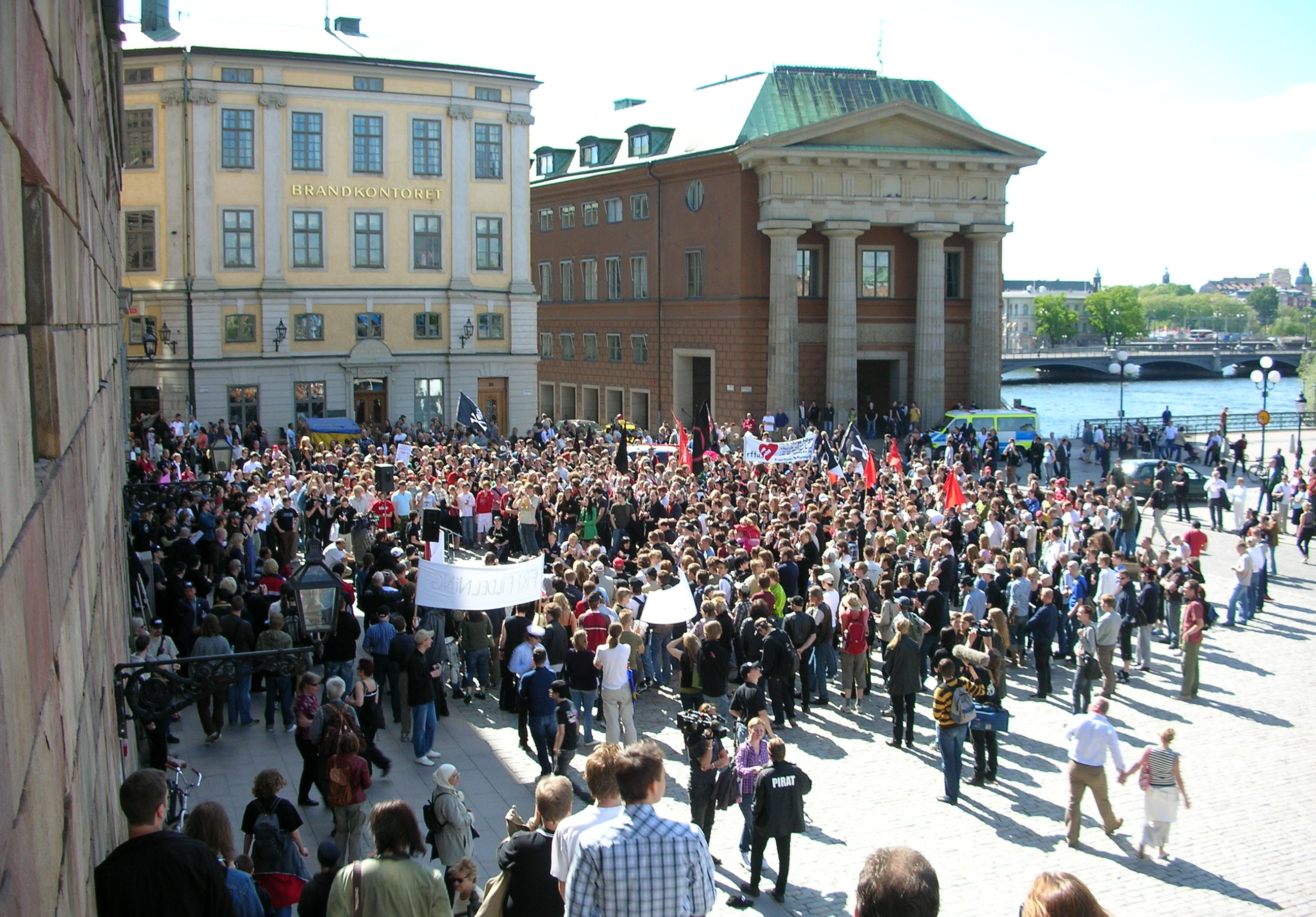
Swedes protesting the police raid during a demonstration on 3 June 2006

On 31 May 2006 the Swedish police organized a raid on The Pirate Bay in 12 different premises, confiscating 186 servers and causing it to go offline for three days. Upon reopening, the site's number of visitors more than doubled, the increased popularity attributed to greater exposure through the media coverage. The raid, alleged by The Pirate Bay to be politically motivated and under pressure from the Motion Picture Association of America (MPAA), was reported as a success by the MPAA in the immediate aftermath but with the website being restored within days and file sharing firmly in focus in the Swedish media, with TorrentFreak calling the raid "highly unsuccessful".

The police, however, conducted a preliminary investigation on the confiscated material and by interrogating associated people. In late 2007, a four thousand page report was produced by the prosecutor in preparation for a trial, containing email and SMS messages, payment documents, police interrogation records, and screenshots of The Pirate Bay site.

== Trial and courtroom charges ==
On 31 January 2008 Swedish prosecutors filed charges against four individuals they associated with The Pirate Bay for "promoting other people's infringements of copyright laws". One of the artists represented by IFPI, Max Peezay, withdrew from the case, decreasing his distributor's compensation demand by 120 000 SEK. Peezay hadn't been asked about participating in the case, and he in fact supports file sharing for private use. Peezay noted however that being unfamiliar with the site, his withdrawal shouldn't be interpreted as a sign of support for their case. The trial began in February 2009. The evidence used in the trial was based on the material acquired in the 2006 raid.

The Swedish national television broadcaster Sveriges Television considered the trial important and provided a live online feed of the entire trial, which had never been done in Sweden before. The live audio and archive sections done in cooperation with Dagens Eko were part of the 24 Direkt program, which became one of their most viewed online content during the trial, second only to Melodifestivalen. The trial was also broadcast live by Swedish public radio.

The defendants referred to the trial as a "Spectrial", which is a portmanteau of "trial" and "spectacle", and set up a blog to inform users on the event. The term has also caught on with some bloggers and supporters.

=== First day of the trial ===
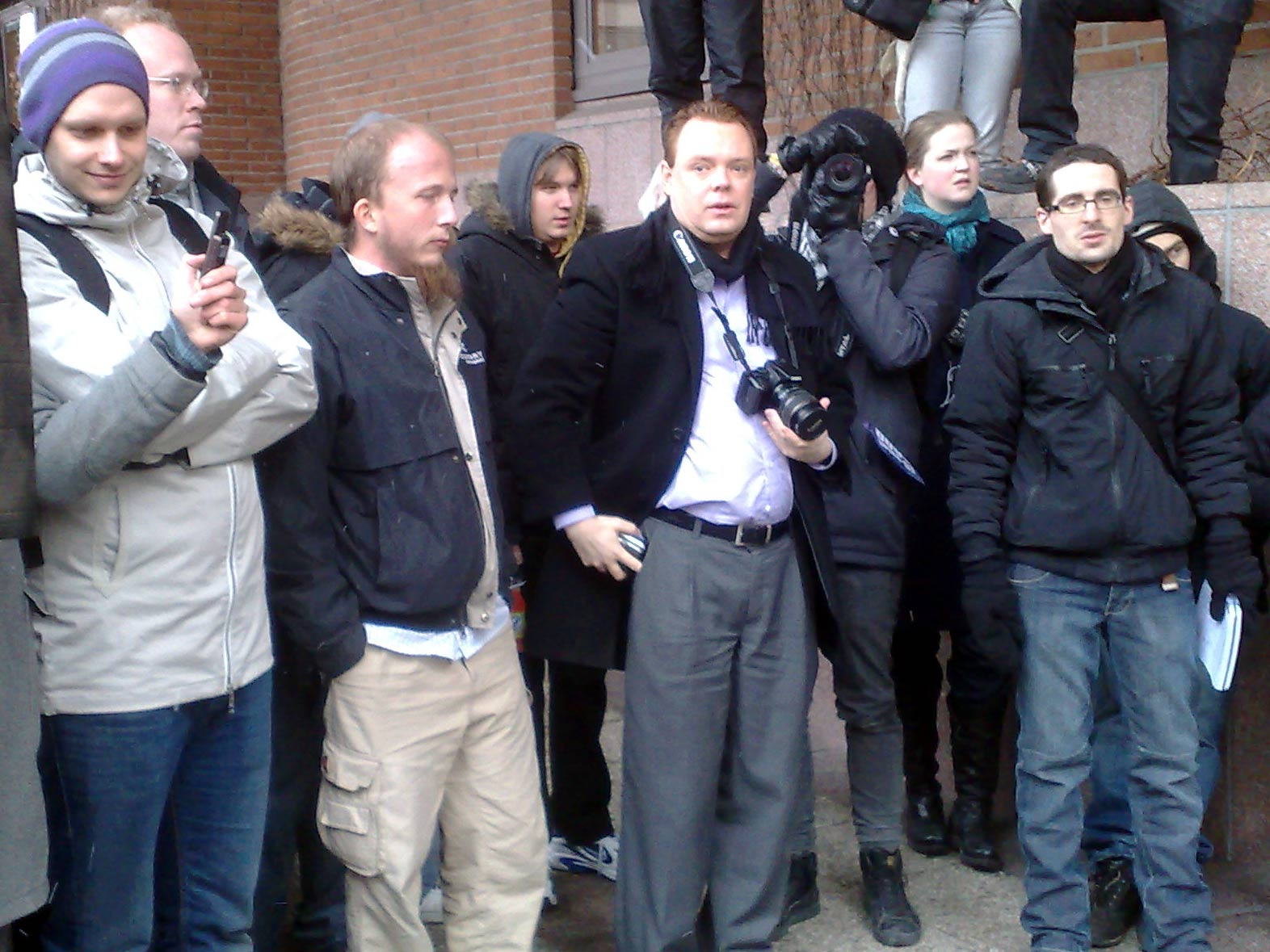
Peter Sunde, Gottfrid Svartholm, Rick Falkvinge and Marcin de Kaminski at the demonstration by the court house on the first day of the trial

On 16 February 2009 defence lawyer Per E. Samuelson stressed to the court that "file sharing services can be used both legally and illegally". Samuelson argued that "it is legal to offer a service that can be used in both a legal and illegal way according to Swedish law" and that The Pirate Bay's services "can be compared to making cars that can be driven faster than the speed limit". Defense attorney Jonas Nilsson insisted that "the individual Internet users who use Pirate Bay services... must answer for the material they have in their possession or the files they plan to share with others."

=== Second day of the trial ===
On 17 February 2009 (the second day of the trial) half of the charges against The Pirate Bay were dropped. According to defense lawyer Per Samuelson, "This is a sensation. It is very rare to win half the case in just one and a half days and it is clear the prosecutor took strong note of what we said yesterday". Peter Danowsky, legal counsel for the music companies, stated "It's a largely technical issue that changes nothing in terms of our compensation claims and has no bearing whatsoever on the main case against The Pirate Bay. In fact it simplifies the prosecutor's case by allowing him to focus on the main issue which is the making available of copyrighted works." The prosecutor was unable to prove that the .torrent files brought as evidence were actually using The Pirate Bay's tracker. Furthermore, prosecutor Håkan Roswall did not adequately explain the function of DHT which allows for so-called "trackerless" torrents. These shortcomings in the evidence resulted in prosecutor Håkan Roswall having to drop all charges relating to "assisting copyright infringement", leaving "assisting making available" as the remaining charge. Roswall stated that "everything related to reproduction will be removed from the claim". Sanna Wolk, a doctor in law and researcher at Stockholm University observed that "this is not surprising, at least for those who follow the matter. We knew that The Pirate Bay wasn't making any copies directly".

=== Third day of the trial ===
On the third day of The Pirate Bay trial, prosecution witnesses claimed damages on the basis that it should have obtained worldwide licenses for the content it distributed. Where content wasn't officially available, a Beatles song, for example, it should be charged at 10 times the going rate. This calculation underlines the prosecution's demand for 117 million SEK (US$12.9 million, €10.2 million) in compensation and damages.

==== "King Kong" defense ====
On day three of the trial, defense attorney Per Samuelson presented an argument later dubbed the "King Kong defense":

EU directive 2000/31/EC says that the person who provides an information service is not responsible for the information that is being transferred. To be responsible, the service provider must initiate the transfer. But the admins of The Pirate Bay don't initiate transfers. It's the users that do and they are physically identifiable people. They call themselves names like King Kong… According to legal procedure, the accusations must be against an individual and there must be a close tie between the perpetrators of a crime and those who are assisting. This tie has not been shown. The prosecutor must show that Carl Lundström personally has interacted with the user King Kong, who may very well be found in the jungles of Cambodia…

Samuelson was referring to a real Pirate Bay user who posts via the username "King Kong", who Samuelson hypothesizes could be in Cambodia. He used this scenario to illustrate that Lundström had no control over the actions undertaken by Pirate Bay users. His main objection was that although the prosecutor had said that the accused would be tried individually, he had not once referred to them individually, but always as "them", "they", or "Pirate Bay". Samuelson said the persons behind The Pirate Bay could not be held collectively responsible for a crime committed by other identifiable individuals, such as "King Kong".

The term "King Kong defense" was quickly popularized by blogs, file sharing news feeds, and media reports on the Pirate Bay trial. Amused online commentators compared it to the Chewbacca defense from the TV series South Park, citing a reference to the "jungles of Cambodia" as "the kind of extraneous detail that makes the Chewbacca defense hilarious".

In its April verdict, the court found that because the defendants indeed had collective responsibility for the site and knew some torrent files on it pointed to copyrighted material, the EU directive did not apply.

=== Fourth day of the trial ===
On 19 February 2009, the fourth day of the trial, Fredrik was questioned several times. It came to the court's attention that Tobias Andersson, a future witness in the case, was in the court where he was later asked to leave the room. When it was movie industry lawyer Monique Wadsted's turn, she introduced new evidence without warning. Noting the breach of protocol, the presiding judge asked if it was acceptable for the court to be considering evidence that was not already presented pre-trial.

=== Fifth day of the trial ===
Day five of the proceedings saw conflict as the prosecution again attempted to introduce evidence that had not been shared with both the court and the defense during pre-trial. The defense objected vehemently with defense lawyer Peter Althin equating the tactic to something out of the old Perry Mason TV show. "Suddenly, the door opens and in walks an entirely new witness." The presiding judge stopped the case to deliberate the matter and found in favor of the defense, instructing the prosecution to immediately hand over all material they planned to use.

The prosecution and the defense spent the remainder of the day delivering conflicting portrayals of the Pirate Bay. The prosecution attempted to show the Pirate Bay as an immensely profitable business that made its money helping others violate copyright law. The defense attempted to show the Pirate Bay as nothing more than a search engine, no different from Google and thus subject to the same protections.

=== Seventh, eighth and ninth days of the trial ===
On days seven to nine, the court heard expert witnesses called by the prosecution and the defense. They cited contradicting academic research on the effects of file sharing on sales in the music and film industry globally and regionally in Sweden.

== Verdict and reactions ==
The four operators of the site were convicted by Stockholm district court on 17 April 2009 and sentenced to one year imprisonment each and a total of 30 million Swedish kronor (approximately US$3.5 million, €2.7 million) in fines and damages. The court found that the defendants were all guilty of accessory to crime against copyright law, strengthened by the commercial and organized nature of the activity. The court, however, never presented its corpus delicti (that is, it never attempted to prove that a crime was committed, but it succeeded in proving that someone was an accessory to that crime). Prosecutor Håkan Roswall cited in his closing arguments a Supreme Court of Sweden opinion that a person holding the jacket of someone committing battery can be held responsible for the battery. In its verdict, the court stated that "responsibility for assistance can strike someone who has only insignificantly assisted in the principal crime", referring to a Supreme Court precedent where an accountant was sentenced for accessory to crime even though his actions were not criminal per se. The court rejected the charge of preparation to crime against copyright law. The lawyers of all four defendants appealed the verdict, with Lundström's lawyers filing their appeal immediately on the day the verdict was given. The entertainment industry lawyers appealed as well, on reintroducing the dismissed charge and on the method of calculating damages, which in their opinion does not fully cover the lost income.

Company	Nationality	Type of Industry	Compensation for damages (SEK)	Costs of litigation (SEK)
20th Century Fox	(United States)	Motion Picture	10,867,460 ($1,285,354.91)	333,500 ($39,444.89)
Mars Media	(Germany)	Motion Picture	4,450,991 ($526,443.45)	333,500 ($39,444.89)
Columbia Pictures	(United States)	Motion Picture	4,184,444 ($494,917.45)	333,500 ($39,444.89)
Yellow Bird	(Sweden)	Motion Picture	3,150,000 ($372,568.01)	484,920 ($57,354.18)
Warner Bros.	(United States)	Motion Picture	2,898,225 ($342,789.18)	592,000 ($70,019.13)
EMI Music Sweden	(United States)	Music	1,798,975 ($212,774.77)	264,000 ($31,224.74)
Warner Music Sweden	(United States)	Music	1,616,759 ($191,223.07)	54,000 ($6,386.88)
Metro-Goldwyn-Mayer	(United States)	Motion Picture	1,394,831 ($372,568.01)	—
Universal Music	(United States)	Music	814,339 ($96,316.40)	156,000 ($18,450.98)
Sony Music Entertainment Sweden	(Japan) (Sweden) (United States)	Music	457,675 ($54,131.76)	468,000 ($55,352.96)
Playground Music	(Sweden)	Music	310,794 ($36,759.33)	156,000 ($18,450.98)
Nordisk Film	(Denmark)	Motion Picture	225,000 ($26,612.00)	53,880 ($6,372.68)
Bonnier Amigo Music Group	(Sweden)	Music	47,349 ($5,600.22)	102,000 ($12,064.10)
Blizzard Entertainment	(United States)	Video games	—	25,000 ($2,956.88)
Activision	(United States)	Video games	—	12,500 ($1,478.44)
		Total:	32,216,842 ($3,810,465.01)	3,368,800 ($398,446.70)

File sharing researcher Daniel Johansson called the ruling the most important file sharing related verdict in Europe so far, comparing it to the Napster verdict in the US. The sentence is the longest ever awarded under Swedish copyright law, and the prison time and damage compensation high by Swedish standards. While most legal experts expected the court to find the defendants guilty, they were surprised at the harsh verdict. Sociology of law professor Håkan Hyden criticised the exceptionally harsh sentence on both the prison time and large amount of compensation awarded, and some legal analysts expect the punishments to be radically lowered in higher courts.

The international public following the trial received the verdict with varying opinions. Some high-profile copyright holders publicly defended the verdict, with former Beatles member Paul McCartney commenting to the BBC that "if you get on a bus, you've got to pay. And I think it's fair, you should pay for your ticket." Mark Mulligan from Forrester Research considered the verdict very important for music industry PR, and copyright holder organisations indeed praised it as a landmark verdict. Likewise, The European Association of Internet Service Providers welcomed the verdict, commending judicial resolution to copyright infringement issues over internet filtering or three strikes policies. The Economist went further by criticising that the sentence might not have been strong enough to act as a deterrent for setting up similar services in the future.

Some copyright holders took a different view however: Snow Patrol vocalist Gary Lightbody commented in interview that "they shouldn't have been jailed... the punishment doesn't fit the crime." In a column in Dagens Nyheter, composer and professor Roger Wallis, who was involved in the trial, condemned the verdict and its effects as paralyzing Swedish IT innovation on new ways of doing business.

At the end of May 2009, Swedish Minister for Culture Lena Adelsohn Liljeroth made a speech to The Swedish Society of Popular Music Composers, expressing her opinion that "I was among those pleased about the Pirate Bay verdict." In accordance with the ministerstyre in the Constitution of Sweden, it is unconstitutional for ministers to influence ongoing cases, and many political commentators criticised the minister's statement. Max Andersson, member of the Committee on the Constitution in the Parliament of Sweden, requested the committee to review the incident. The committee pointed out the independence of judicial bodies and the government, and reminded ministers to exercise caution in their statements, but saw no need for further action or comment.

=== Subsequent events ===
Over 25,000 people joined the Swedish Pirate Party in the ten days following the guilty verdict, raising its membership to over 40,000 members and making it the fourth-largest Swedish party by membership count at the time, and the party with the largest youth organisation. In Stockholm and other cities, the Pirate Party organized protests against the court's verdict. Over 1000 protesters gathered in the streets of Stockholm the following day. Protest leader Malin Littorin-Ferm said "we young people have a whole platform on the Internet, where we have all our social contacts—it is there that we live. The state is trying to control the Internet and, by extension, our private lives". Pirate Party chairman Rickard Falkvinge claimed at the protests that "the establishment and the politicians have declared war against our whole generation,"

Following the conviction, the IFPI demanded that Swedish internet service providers block The Pirate Bay, but the ISPs have refused to do this. Jon Karlung, managing director of Bahnhof, stated that "we will not censor sites for our customers; that is not our job. I am against anything that contradicts the principle of a free and open Internet."

Several Swedish file sharing sites have closed voluntarily with The Pirate Bay verdict as a deterrent and as a result of further police investigation.

On 20 April 2009, Anonymous mobilized "Operation Baylout", which included a DDoS attack on the IFPI International website, causing the site to go offline for a few hours. They released a statement asking supporters of file-sharing to refrain from making any industry-related media purchases during the months of April and May.

Two artists originally mentioned in the indictment, Advance Patrol and Max Peezay, later went on to release their work on The Pirate Bay in spring 2009.

==== Gottfrid Svartholm arrest (2012) ====
Gottfrid Svartholm, one of the TPB founding members, was arrested on 2 September 2012, in Phnom Penh, Cambodia, while evading Swedish authorities following the 2009 verdict and conviction. A group of Anonymous hackers claimed to have attacked websites and internet systems belonging to the Cambodian government in the wake of the arrest. Although at the time of the arrest an extradition treaty was non-existent between Cambodia and Sweden, negotiations were entered into for the purpose of expelling Svartholm.

==== Fredrik Neij arrest (2014) ====
Fredrik Neij, the last of the website's founders to be detained after dodging the 2009 conviction for copyright violations, was detained and later arrested in November 2014 in Nong Khai, Thailand. Swedish officials were brought in and Thai officials stated he would be extradited within the month.

== Bias allegations ==
In mid 2008 after the indictment had been served, it was discovered that the main police investigator in the preliminary investigation had started working for one of the plaintiffs, Warner Brothers, before the date of the indictment. Sunde's lawyer Peter Althin questioned the neutrality and reliability of the preliminary investigation in the event that the investigator had entered the new employment during the investigation, and suspected the job might have been a reward for good work in The Pirate Bay investigation. Althin believed that the investigation might have to be redone if that was the case. The prosecutor Håkan Roswall responded that it wouldn't have posed problems for the investigation because the police were working under his directive, and the investigator's superior officer brushed off the incident as nothing remarkable. Warner Brothers commented merely that the investigator hadn't received any compensation during the time he worked for the Swedish police. According to Roswall, this type of concurrent employment would not be an individual incident, but that the decision of possible bias would be for the court to decide, and that the investigator is not a key witness in the case. The investigator could not be reached during the trial and was taken off the witness list.

Only days before the trial began, one of the three appointed lay judges was discovered to be a member of a composers' association that among others works on protecting copyright. After discussing with judge Tomas Norström the problem the membership could pose to the trial, the composer recused himself from acting as a lay judge in the case and he was replaced with another.

In the aftermath of the trial, presiding judge Tomas Norström, the same judge that ordered the 2006 raid on The Pirate Bay's servers, came under scrutiny after allegations of bias. Sveriges Radio P3 News organized an investigation that found on 23 April that Norström had several engagements with organisations interested in intellectual property issues. Peter Danowsky, Monique Wadsted and Henrik Pontén from the prosecution side are also members of one of the organisations, the Swedish Copyright Association (SFU). Wadsted commented that all intellectual property lawyers in Stockholm are part of the association. According to Norström, the organisations are involved in discussion about copyright, while the earlier lay judges's organisation advocates further copyright protection. Norström however also sits in the board of the Swedish Association for the Protection of Industrial Property, which along with the SFU are the Swedish branches of International Association for the Protection of Industrial Property (AIPPI) and Association littéraire et artistique internationale (ALAI). AIPPI's website states that "the objective of AIPPI is to improve and promote the protection of intellectual property on both an international and national basis", and ALAI's president Victor Nabhan commented that his organisation is dedicated mostly to defending copyright holders' interests. Several legal experts have commented that the judge should not have taken the case because of the potential conflict of interest or should at least have mentioned it in the beginning of the trial, and that there are grounds for a retrial. The district court itself however defended judges' membership in these types of organisations, and it is not uncommon for lay judges to even be sitting municipal politicians.

Following the discovery on 23 April, Peter Sunde's lawyer Peter Althin announced that he would request for a retrial. The Swedish Parliamentary Ombudsman decided not to investigate the bias since the question had already been requested to be taken up in the Svea Court of Appeal. The court of appeal received the case on 18 May and assigned it to judge Ulrika Ihrfelt. On the question of bias, Ihrfelt stated she was a member of the Swedish Copyright Association in 2005 when working in the supreme court, but didn't consider herself biased because of this. The president of the court was requested to reassign the case, and on 20 May it was reassigned to three judges from another court of appeal department. The district court along with the prosecutor formally defended judges' memberships in these types of organisations as a way to gain knowledge on copyright issues. The court of appeal considered it a priority case, and ruled on 25 June that the judge's memberships do not constitute bias and that there would be no retrial in the district court.

During the preparation for the appeal trial, bias allegations were also made on the court of appeal. In Swedish appeal proceedings for criminal cases where the sentence is greater than a fine, the court usually consists of three professional judges and two lay judges. Judge Ihrfelt, again appointed to the case, informed the parties in mid September 2009 that one of the appointed lay judges is working for the music streaming service Spotify, which is partly owned by record companies. The lay judge himself didn't feel biased because of his work, but prosecuting attorney Danowsky commented that anyone both judging the case and working for Spotify has a conflict of interest. Later on the same week, defense attorney Samuelsson submitted allegations to the appeal court of Ihrfelt and another professional judge being biased for their membership in the same interest groups judge Norström was investigated for. In the court's opinion, the judges' memberships did not constitute bias, whereas the lay judges's impartiality was questionable and he was dismissed. The court's decision was appealed, and in May 2010 the supreme court affirmed the appeal court's decision on the bias question.

== Parties ==
=== Defendants ===
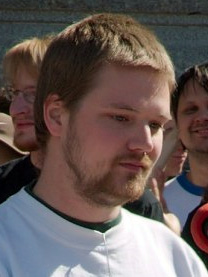
Fredrik Neij

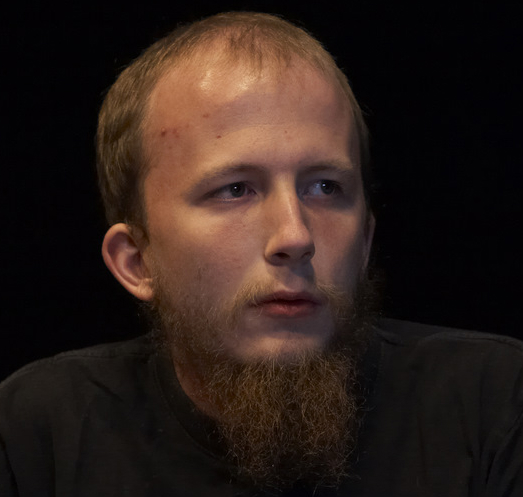
Gottfrid Svartholm

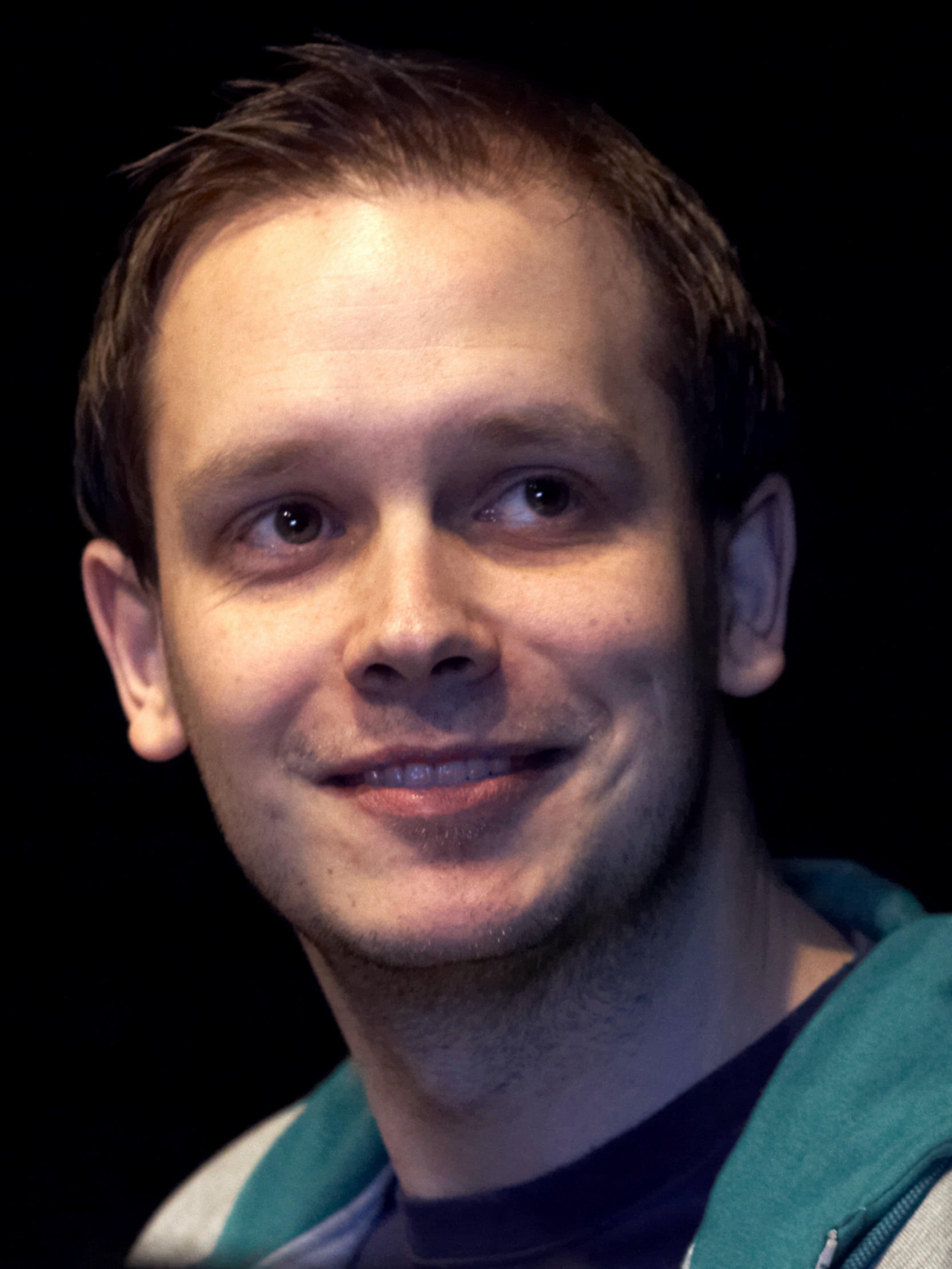
Peter Sunde

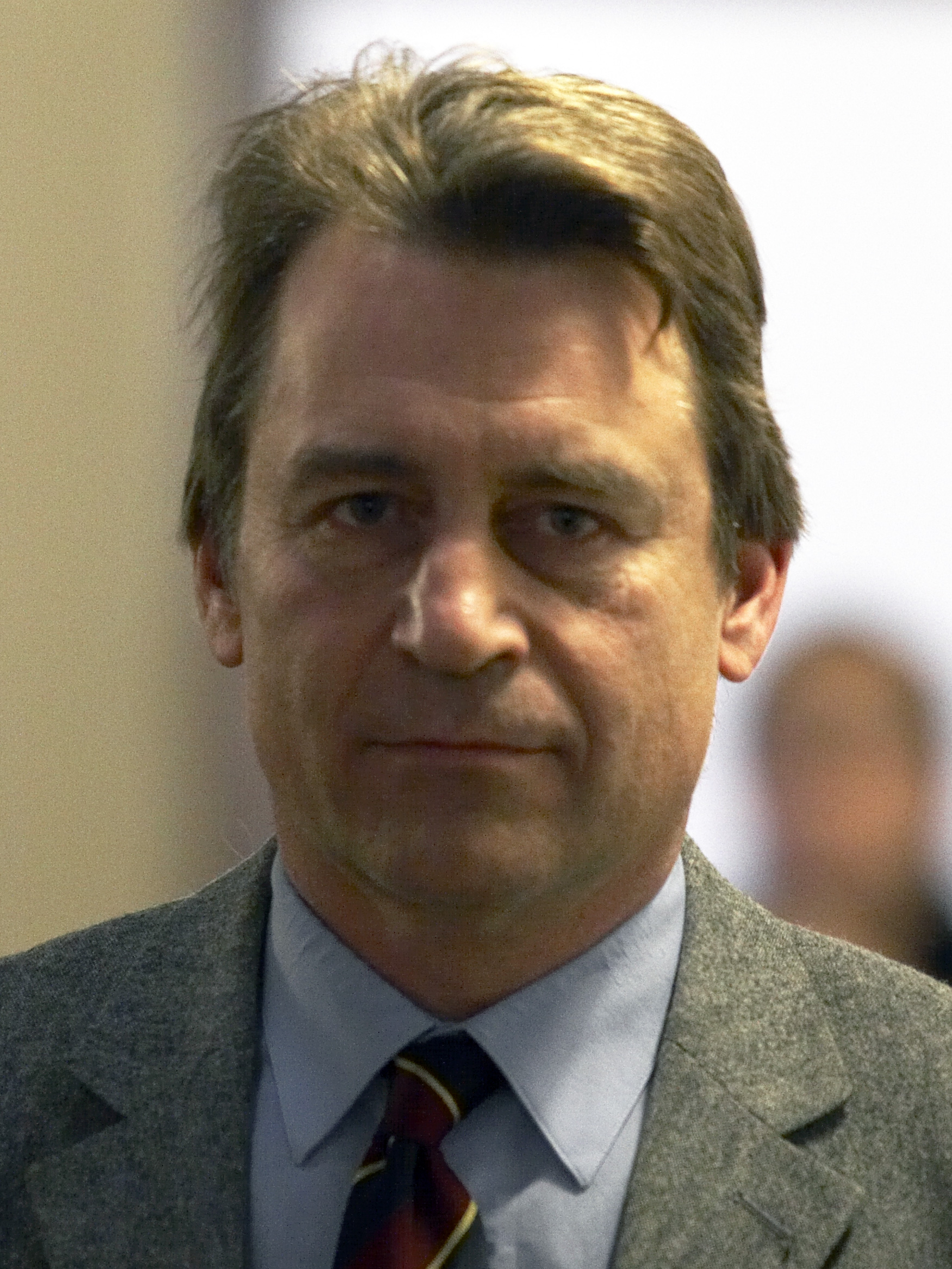
Carl Lundström

=== Plaintiffs ===
The criminal charges against The Pirate Bay are directly supported by the following prosecution witnesses:

- IFPI representing:
  - Sony BMG Music Entertainment Sweden AB
  - Universal Music AB
  - Playground Music Scandinavia AB
  - Bonnier Amigo Music Group AB
  - EMI Music Sweden AB
  - Warner Bros. Music Sweden AB
- Antipiratbyrån representing:
  - Yellow Bird Films AB
  - Nordisk Film
  - Henrik Danstrup
- MAQS Law Firm Advokatbyrå KB representing:
  - Warner Bros. Entertainment Inc
  - MGM Pictures Inc
  - Columbia Pictures Industries Inc
  - 20th Century Fox Films Co
  - Mars Media Beteiligungs GmbH & Co Filmproduktions
  - Blizzard Entertainment Inc
  - Sierra Entertainment Inc
  - Activision Publishing Inc

== Appeal ==
After sentencing, the defendants decided to appeal the verdict of the first trial. The appeal started on 28 September 2010 and concluded on 15 October 2010. On 26 November 2010, the verdict was announced. In the verdict, the court found that "The Pirate Bay has facilitated illegal file sharing in a way that results in criminal liability for those who run the service." Under the verdict, the sentences of three of the defendants would be reduced and the total fines would be increased. The fourth defendant, Gottfrid Svartholm, was not present at the time for medical reasons. His time for appeal expired on 14 October 2011, and the original 2009 sentence became legally binding for him.

The sentence from the appeal traded jail time for increased fines. After the initial trial, each defendant was to serve a year of jail time and pay fines just under one million dollars each. After the appeal, Fredrik Neij was sentenced to 10 months, Peter Sunde to eight months, and Carl Lundstrom to four months in prison. The Svea Court of Appeal decided to grant all Nordic companies their full request in compensation for copyright infringement due to The Pirate Bay, with outside companies being granted smaller gains in compensation. The total fine for the three defendants was increased from 32 million Kronor to 46 million Kronor (US$6.5 million). Each defendant was issued different sentences because of individual contribution toward facilitating illegal file sharing. Instead of issuing all defendants the same sentence, they were each judged on their contribution and sentenced accordingly. However, the fine is to be paid by the three defendants present at the sentencing. The verdict was appealed to the Supreme Court.

== Events during the trial ==
=== Support campaign ===
On 18 February 2009 the Norwegian socialist party Red began a global campaign in support of The Pirate Bay and filesharers worldwide that lasted until 1 May. The campaign was timed to coincide with the trial. Through the website filesharer.org individuals were encouraged to upload their photographs, as "mugshots", to "let the music and movie industry know who the file-sharers are." The site encourages participation urging people to "Upload a picture of yourself and show them what a criminal looks like!". Red politician Elin Volder Rutle is the initiator of the campaign and she states to the media that "If the guys behind Pirate Bay are criminals, then so am I, and so are most other Norwegians."

=== IFPI website hack ===
The website of the International Federation of the Phonographic Industry (IFPI) was hacked and defaced with a message to Håkan Roswall, the prosecutor in the trial. The website subsequently became inaccessible, possibly owing to a denial-of-service attack. It was shortly brought back online. Peter Sunde, one of the defendants, responded to news of the attack with the comment "Our case is going quite well as most of you have noticed. In the light of that it feels very bad that people are hacking web sites which actually puts us in a worse light than we need to be in." To the perpetrators of the attack he also pleaded, "If anyone involved in the acts going on is reading this—please stop, for our sake. We don't need that kind of support."

=== Flower storm ===
During the ninth day of the trial, after the testimony of professor emeritus Roger Wallis had been completed, he was asked according to Swedish court procedures if he wanted any compensation for appearing in court. He declined this but commented to the court that they were welcome to send flowers to his wife if they wished. This was rejected by the judge but quickly caught on amongst supporters of The Pirate Bay following the proceedings via live feeds and other Internet services. A channel was started on the EFnet network on IRC and a website followed and by the evening flowers for almost SEK 40.000 (US$5,000, €3,000) had been ordered for the couple through Internet florists such as Interflora and local florists.

== See also ==
- File sharing and the law
- Judicial system of Sweden
- Steal This Episode
- Telecoms Package
- Timeline of file sharing
- TPB AFK
