= Fredrik Neij =

Swedish activist (born 1978)

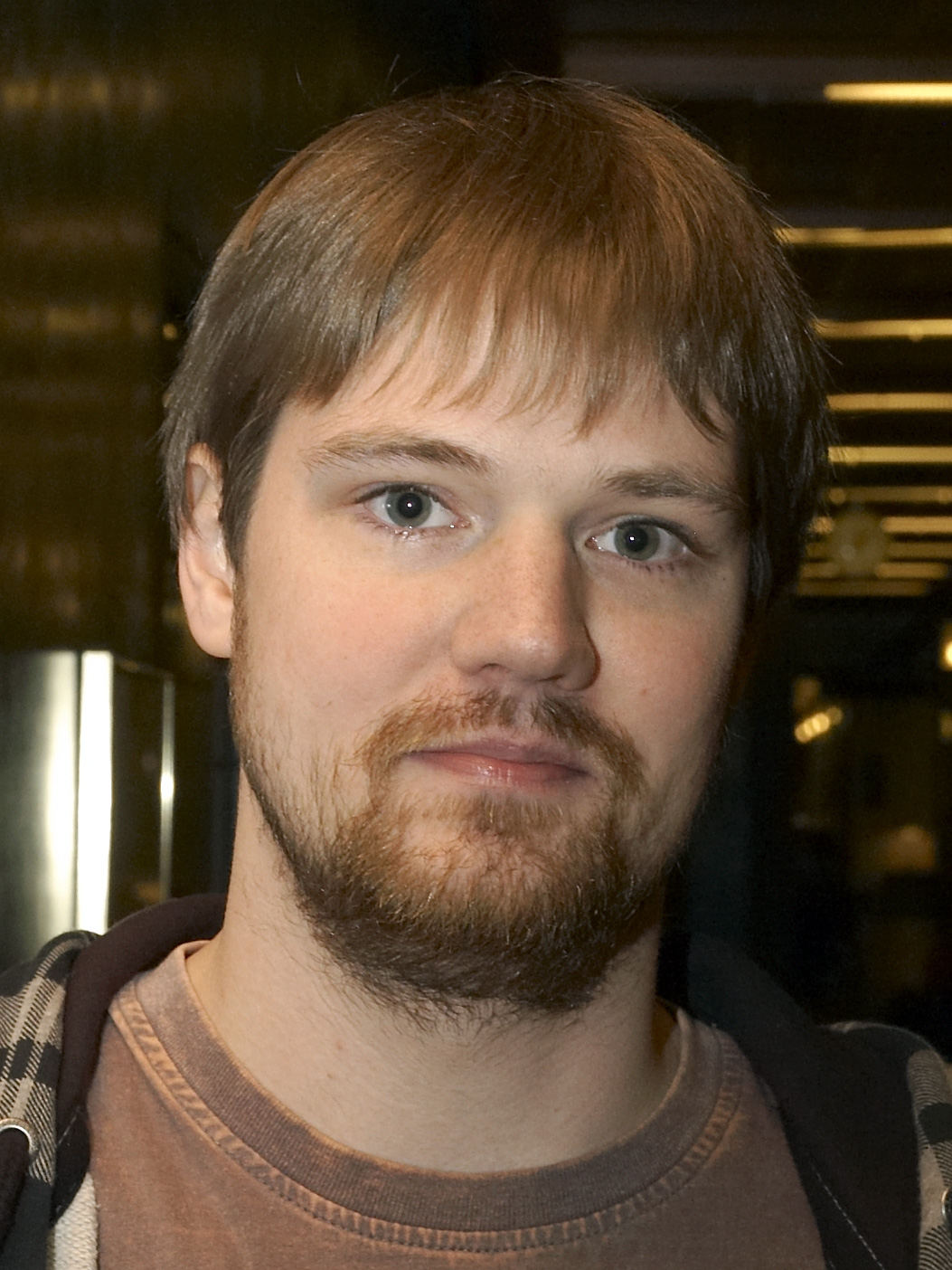
- Neij in 2009
- Born: Hans Fredrik Lennart Neij; 27 April 1978 (age 48); Jönköping, Sweden
- Other name: TiAMO
- Known for: Co-founder of The Pirate Bay who was convicted of assisting copyright infringement
- Children: 1

Hans Fredrik Lennart Neij (born 27 April 1978), alias TiAMO, is the co-founder of The Pirate Bay, and the Swedish Internet service provider and web hosting company PRQ. Neij was one of the defendants in The Pirate Bay trial which began on 16 February 2009. He and other operators of The Pirate Bay were charged with assisting users in copyright infringing practices. His time during the aforementioned trial has been captured in the documentary film TPB AFK by Simon Klose.

== Legal issues ==
On 17 April 2009, Neij was found guilty of copyright infringement and he was sentenced to one year in prison and ordered to pay damages of $905,000.

In November 2014, Neij was arrested in Nong Khai on an Interpol warrant while attempting to cross the border from Laos to Thailand. Thai authorities stated that a US-based film association had a Thai lawyer search for Neij and aid in his capture. Thai immigration officials claimed that during his three years in Laos, he had crossed the border almost 30 times into Thailand, where he had a home on the resort island of Phuket. BayFiles, a Pirate Bay-affiliated file hosting website registered under Neij's name, was abruptly shut down after the arrest.

Neij served two-thirds (200 days) of a 10-month sentence in Skänninge Prison in central Sweden. He was released on 1 June 2015 and was planning to settle in Laos and work in IT.
