= Carl Lundström =

Swedish businessman and activist (1960–2025)

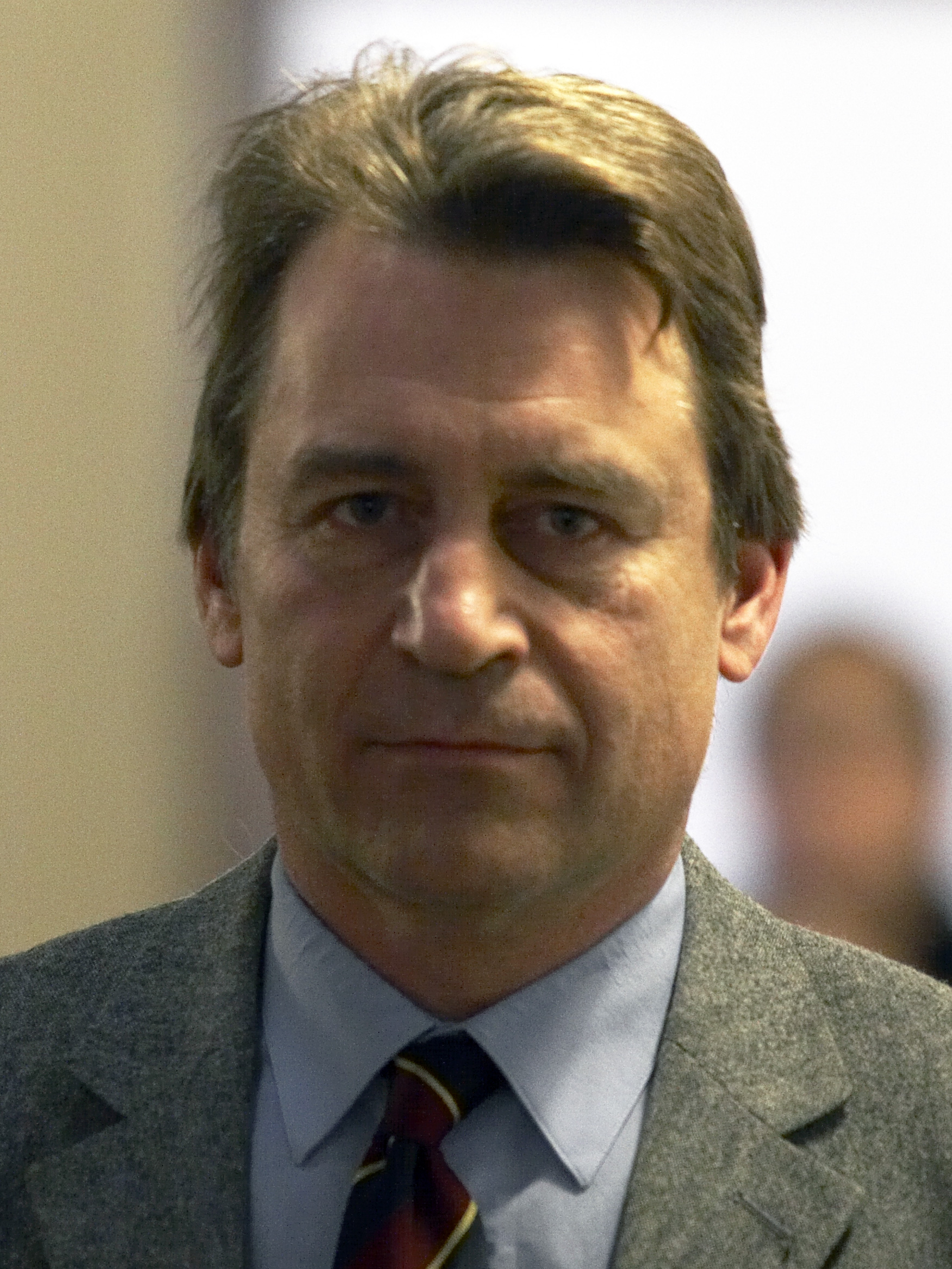
- Born: Carl Ulf Sture Lundström; 13 April 1960; Filipstad, Sweden
- Died: 10 March 2025 (aged 64); Velika Planina, Slovenia
- Occupation: Businessman
- Known for: Founder of Rix Telecom; Defendant in The Pirate Bay trial

Carl Ulf Sture Lundström (13 April 1960 – 10 March 2025) was a Swedish businessman and political activist. He founded Rix Telecom, which provided services and equipment to torrent tracker The Pirate Bay from 2003 to 2005. Lundström was one of the defendants in The Pirate Bay trial and was charged with "accessory to breaching copyright law". He was found guilty and ultimately sentenced to four months in prison. He and his co-defendants were jointly fined 46 million Swedish krona.

Lundström was involved with various far-right political organisations in Sweden. He was an Alternative for Sweden candidate in the 2021 Swedish Church Assembly elections.

== Early life and career ==
Carl Lundström was the grandson of Karl Edvard Lundström, founder of the world's largest crisp bread producer Wasabröd, and the son of Ulf Lundström. When his father died in 1973, Carl was one of five heirs to Wasabröd. In 1982, Wasabröd was sold to the Swiss pharmaceutical company Sandoz. Lundström founded and financed a number of companies, notably Swedish telecom, internet and co-location provider Rix Telecom.

== The Pirate Bay trial ==
Between 2003 and 2005, Lundström's company Rix Telecom provided services and equipment to torrent tracker The Pirate Bay. Lundström was one of the four defendants in The Pirate Bay trial, charged with "accessory to breaching copyright law". On 17 April 2009, the Stockholm district court found all defendants guilty and sentenced them to one year in prison and to jointly pay 30 million SEK (app. €2.7 million or US$3.5 million) in damages. The verdict was appealed. The appeal was partially successful, as his sentence was reduced to four months, but the fine was increased to 46 million SEK. Lundström served his prison sentence.

== Political activism ==
Lundström was involved with various far-right political organisations in Sweden. In the 1980s, he was a member of Bevara Sverige Svenskt. In 1991, he financed the Progress Party, which later merged with the Sweden Democrats, and in 2001, the National Democrats publicized having received a donation of SEK 5 000 from Lundström.

In 2005, Lundström took part in an oppositional group within the Swedish Taxpayers' Association, protesting the association's passive stance on the issue of costs for immigration. He stood as a candidate for Alternative for Sweden in the 2021 Swedish Church Assembly elections.

== Death ==
Lundström died on 10 March 2025 when the plane he was piloting crashed into a hut in Velika Planina, Slovenia. He was 64. He was the only person on board, en route from Zagreb to St. Gallen-Altenrhein.
