= Internet in the European Union =

The internet in the European Union is built through the infrastructure of member states, and regulated by EU law for data privacy, and a free and open media.

== Infrastructure ==
- WiFi boxes
- Cables, copper to fibre-optic
- Electro-magnetic signals
- Transnational lines

== Regulation ==
- Electronic Communications Code Directive 2018/1972 arts 3-17, 61-84
- Access Directive 2002/19/EC arts 3-6 and Annex I
- Information Society Directive 2015/1535 Annex I
- Electronic Commerce Directive 2000/31/EC arts 1, 3, 14-15
- General Data Protection Regulation 2016/679 arts 4(11), 5-8, 13-17
- Net Neutrality Regulation 2015/2120 art 3(3)
- Roaming Regulation (EU) No 531/2012 arts 7-8

== Speed ==
The European Union pledges that all households will have at least 100 Mbps internet speed in 2025, and 1000 Mbps not until 2030.

== See also ==
- EU law
- History of the Internet
- List of Internet pioneers
- Packet switching
- Protocol Wars
