= Integrity (disambiguation) =

Integrity is the ethical concept of basing of one's actions on a consistent framework of principles.

Integrity may also refer to:

== Technology ==
- Data integrity, a concept from information and telecommunications technology in general, and cryptography in particular
- System integrity, a telecommunications concept regarding the operation of a system
- Integrity (operating system), a real-time operating system produced and marketed by Green Hills Software
- HPE Integrity Servers, a server line from Hewlett Packard Enterprise based on the Itanium processor
- Integrity by Tandem Computers, a fault-tolerant server line and Unix-based operating system whose trademark passed to HP
- PTC Integrity, a software system lifecycle management and application lifecycle management platform

== Arts and media ==
- Artistic integrity, the ability to omit corrupting values that would otherwise alter an artist's original vision

=== Music ===
- Integrity (band), an American punk rock band formed in 1988
  - Integrity 2000, a 1999 album by American punk band Integrity
- Integrity (album), 2015 album by British grime artist Jme

=== TV and films ===
- "Integrity" (Modern Family), a 2015 episode from the TV series Modern Family
- Integrity (film), a 2019 Hong Kong crime film

=== Media companies ===
- Integrity Media, a media communications company that publishes and distributes Christian music, films and related materials
- Integrity Records, a British independent record label

== Legal ==
- Bodily integrity, the principle of a human right to personal autonomy
- Territorial integrity, a principle under international law
- Integrity Staffing Solutions, Inc. v. Busk, a 2014 US Supreme Court decision

== Politics ==
- Integrity Party (New Zealand)
- Integrity Party (United Kingdom)
- IntegrityTO a civic pressure group in Toronto

== Vehicles ==
- HMCS Integrity (1804), a cutter that disappeared in 1805 while en route from New South Wales to Chile
- HMS Integrity, a name used by the Royal Navy for several ships
- Integrity (1824 ship), an English merchant ship
- MV American Integrity, an American ship built in 1978
- ARC Integrity, Vehicle Carrier built in 1992
- Integrity, the Orion spacecraft used in the Artemis II mission

== Other uses ==
- IntegrityBC, a Canadian non-profit organization focusing on political reform
- Integrity Toys, an American toy company
- Integrity USA, an American non-profit organization of lesbian, gay, bisexual, and transgender Episcopalians and straight friends
- Global Integrity, a nonprofit organization based in Washington, DC which monitors governmental corruption around the world
