= Erik Josefsson =

Erik Josefsson may refer to:

- Erik Josefsson (activist), Swedish internet activist
- Erik Josefsson (ice hockey), ice hockey player in Swedish Elitserien
