= Net Neutrality Regulation 2015 =

The Net Neutrality Regulation 2015 is a Regulation in EU law where article 3(3) lays down measures concerning open internet access.

The regulation's text has been criticized as offering loopholes that can undermine the regulation's effectiveness. Some European Union member countries, such as Slovenia and the Netherlands, have stronger net neutrality laws.

== Regulation history ==
The 2002 regulatory framework for electronic communications networks and services in the European Union consisted of five directives, which are referred to as "the Framework Directive and the Specific Directives":

- Access Directive (Directive 2002/19/EC)
- Authorization Directive (Directive 2002/20/EC)
- Framework Directive (Directive 2002/21/EC)
- Universal Service Directive (Directive 2002/22/EC)
- Directive on privacy and electronic communications (Directive 2002/58/EC)

When the European Commission consulted on the updating of the Framework Directive and the Specific Directives in November 2007, it examined the possible need for legislation to mandate network neutrality, countering the potential damage, if any, caused by non-neutral broadband access. The European Commission stated that prioritisation "is generally considered to be beneficial for the market so long as users have choice to access the transmission capabilities and the services they want" and "consequently, the current EU rules allow operators to offer different services to different customers groups, but not allow those who are in a dominant position to discriminate in an anti-competitive manner between customers in similar circumstances".

However, the European Commission highlighted that Europe's current legal framework cannot effectively prevent network operators from degrading their customers' services. Therefore, the European Commission proposed that it should be empowered to impose a minimum quality of services requirements. In addition, an obligation of transparency was proposed to limit network operators' ability to set up restrictions on end-users' choice of lawful content and applications.

On 19 December 2009, the so-called "Telecoms Package" came into force and EU member states were required to implement the Directive by May 2011. According to the European Commission the new transparency requirements in the Telecoms Package would mean that "consumers will be informed—even before signing a contract—about the nature of the service to which they are subscribing, including traffic management techniques and their impact on service quality, as well as any other limitations (such as bandwidth caps or available connection speed)". Regulation (EC) No 1211/2009 of the European Parliament and of the Council of 25 November 2009 established the Body of European Regulators for Electronic Communications (BEREC) and the Office Body of European Regulators of Electronic Communications. BEREC's main purpose is to promote cooperation between national regulatory authorities, ensuring a consistent application of the EU regulatory framework for electronic communications.

The European Parliament voted the EU Commission's September 2013 proposal on its first reading in April 2014 and the Council adopted a mandate to negotiate in March 2015. Following the adoption of the Digital Single Market Strategy by the Commission on 6 May, Heads of State and Government agreed on the need to strengthen the EU telecoms single market. After 18 months of negotiations, the European Parliament, Council and Commission reached two agreements on the end to roaming charges and on the first EU-wide rules on net neutrality on 30 June 2015, to be completed by an overhaul of EU telecoms rules in 2016. Specifically, article 3 of EU Regulation 2015/2120 sets the basic framework for ensuring net neutrality across the entire European Union. However, the regulation's text has been criticized as offering loopholes that can undermine the regulation's effectiveness.

=== National regulations ===
The EU has laid down a framework on net neutrality, but some of EU states have stronger laws nationally, or are discussing passing them. However Neelie Kroes, former European Commissioner for Digital Agenda, has asked "national legislators and regulators to wait for better evidence before regulating on an uncoordinated, country-by-country basis that slows down the creation of a Digital Single Market".

| Member State | Situation | Details |
|---|---|---|
| Belgium | Under discussion | In Belgium, net neutrality was discussed in the parliament in June 2011. Three parties (CD&V, N-VA & PS) jointly proposed a text to introduce the concept of net neutrality in the telecom law. |
| France | Under discussion | In France, on 12 April 2011, the Commission for economic affairs of the French parliament approved the report of MP Laure de La Raudière (UMP). The report contains 9 proposals. Propositions n°1 & 2 act on net neutrality. |
| Italy | Under discussion | In March 2009, the following bill was put forward: Proposta di legge dei senatori Vincenzo VITA (PD) e Luigi Vimercati (PD), "Neutralità Delle Reti, Free Software E Societa' Dell'informazione". Senator Vimercati in an interview said that he wants "to do something for the network neutrality" and that he was inspired by Lawrence Lessig, Professor at the Stanford Law School. Vimercati said that the topic is very hard, but in the article 3 there is a reference to the concept of neutrality regard the contents. It is also a problem of transparency and for the mobile connections: we need the minimum bandwidth to guarantee the service. We need some principle to defend the consumers. It's important that the consumer has been informed if he could not access all the Internet. The bill refuses all the discrimination: related by the content, the service and the device. The bill is generally about Internet ("a statute for the Internet") and treat different topics like network neutrality, free software, giving an Internet access to everyone. |
| Netherlands | Law passed 2012 | See also: Net neutrality in the Netherlands On June 4, 2012, the Netherlands became the first country in Europe and the second in the world, after Chile, to enact a network neutrality law. The main provision of the law requires that "Providers of public electronic communication networks used to provide Internet access services as well as providers of Internet access services will not hinder or slow down services or applications on the Internet". |
| Slovenia | Law passed 2012 | At the end of 2012, Slovenia legislated a law of electronic communication implementing a strong principle of net neutrality. Slovenia thus became the second country in Europe to enact a net neutrality law. The Government Agency for Communications, Networks and Services (AKOS) is enforcing the law and executes inspections. In January 2015 it found zero-rating infringements at the two largest mobile network providers, Telekom and Simobil (now A1). In February it found similar infringements also at Amis (now Simobil) and Tušmobil (now Telemach). In July 2016 the Administrative Court of the Republic of Slovenia annulled the decisions of AKOS. |

== Potential violations ==
In 2007, the British ISP Plusnet was using deep packet inspection to implement limits and differential charges for peer-to-peer, file transfer protocol, and online game traffic. However, their network management philosophy was made clear for each package they sold, and was consistent between different websites.

In 2017, Germany mobile network operators like Deutsche Telekom and Vodafone were offering services that seemed to affect net neutrality. The government agency overseeing the market (Bundesnetzagentur) stated, in general these plans are in alignment with net neutrality but forced the companies to adopt some changes.

== Criticism ==
European net neutrality law has been criticised for leaving too many loopholes to be exploited, as amendments to close them failed to gain enough support across the European Parliament. Some loopholes include the ability to offer priority to "specialised services", provided they still treat the "open" internet equally. Such services included remote surgery, driverless cars and anti-terrorism efforts. The law does say that these services cannot be offered if they restrict bandwidth for normal users. Another exemption is giving websites a "Zero-rating", not counting a website against a user's data limits, giving an advantage to those sites when being viewed via a metered connection.

== See also ==
- EU law
- Digital Single Market
- Telecoms Package
- Net neutrality
