= Electronic Communications Code Directive 2018 =

The Electronic Communications Code Directive (Directive (EU) 2018/1972) is a directive in EU law, which regulates electronic communications networks and services.

== Background ==
The ECC was adopted in December 2018 and consolidated and reformed the existing regulation framework. By 2020 member states had to adapt their telecommunications regulations in accordance with the ECC.

The laws in the Code were previously found in the Telecoms Package and Universal Service Directive, and then the Electronic Communications Directive 2009, and Universal Service Directive 2009.

== Contents ==
The Electronic Communications Code Directive contains the following norms.

=== Part I, on regulators ===
Title I

- Article 2 covers definitions
- Article 3 covers general objectives, such as promoting connectivity, competition, the internal market, the interests of citizens.

Title II, on regulators

- Articles 5 requires a "competent authority" is in charge of regulating communication markets, including access and interconnection obligations, dispute resolution, allocating the radio spectrum, protecting end-user rights, monitoring the market and "competition issues regarding open internet access", providing universal service, and enabling number portability.
- Article 6 requires that member state regulators are independent.
- Article 7 requires that regulator heads are appointed for at least three years, and dismissed only for failing to perform their duties by law, with public reasons.
- Article 8 requires political independence.
- Article 10 requires participation in the Body of European Regulators for Electronic Communications
- Article 11 requires cooperation with other authorities.
- Article 12 requires that use of electronic communication networks is authorised.
- Article 13 requires that conditions are non-discriminatory, proportionate and transparent
- Article 17 requires separate accounting and financial reports for the running of an electronic communication network from other activities.

=== Part II, on networks ===
Market entry, authorisation

- Article 46, member states should set out conditions for use of a wireless telegraphy station or using apparatus, unless exempt.

Access for others to networks

- Article 61–62, member states should encourage access and interconnection to promote competition and maximum benefit to end-users. Special duties for undertakings with significant market power. (Note: Formerly Access Directive: arts 3-6 and Annex I.)
- Articles 68-73 require various standards for setting conditions
- Article 71 and 77–79 on accounting and functional separation.
- Article 74 says a regulator can have obligations for cost recovery and price controls

Service provision

- Article 84 says member states shall "ensure that all consumers in their territories have access at an affordable price, in light of specific national conditions, to an available adequate broadband internet access service and to voice communications services at the quality specified in their territories, including the underlying connection, at a fixed location."

== Implementation ==
The European Commission decided on 6 April 2022 to refer 10 Member States to the Court of Justice of the EU for their failure to fully transpose and communicate to the commission, their States full compliance with EECC Directive under Article 260(3) of the Treaty and have requested the Court impose upon them, financial sanctions, for the failure.

The 2013 modification of the Radio Spectrum Policy Programme was used as the basis of the section concerning the radio spectrum.

== See also ==
- EU law
