= Net neutrality in Chile =

In Chile, net neutrality is regulated by the Law Nº 20.453, known as the Chilean net neutrality law. The law was issued on August 18, 2010, becoming the first country in the world to enact a law related to the net neutrality principle.

The law modified the General Law of Telecommunications, adding three articles —24 H, 24 I and 24 J— which establish rights for the Internet users and obligations for Internet service providers. In addition, the law give enforcement powers to the regulator, the Telecommunications Undersecretary (Subsecretaría de Telecomunicaciones, Subtel).

== History ==
The law was generated in a parliamentary motion dated on March 20, 2007 —Bulletin N° 4915-19— presented by the deputies Gonzalo Arenas, Marcelo Díaz, Enrique Estay, Alejandro García-Huidobro, Patricio Hales, Javier Hernández, Tucapel Jiménez, José Antonio Kast, Carlos Recondo and Felipe Ward. The bill was initially intended to add three articles to the Law Nº 19.496 about consumer protection. However, the articles were finally added to the General Law of Telecommunications, following a report of the Commission on Sciences and Technology of the Chamber of Deputies, and comments by the Telecommunications Undersecretary Pablo Bello and NGOs representatives.

On October 11, 2007 the bill was approved by deputies by 66 votes, 0 votes against and 2 abstentions. On November 11 it was sent to the Senate, and was amended by the Commission on Transports and Telecommunications after hearing telcos representatives, on April 3, 2008. The Senate approved the modified bill on April 30 by 30 votes in favour and one abstention.

In June 2008, the bill received indications by president Michelle Bachelet, and was reviewed by the Commissions on Economy and Transports. Then the bill returned to the Chamber of Deputies, being approved on June 13, 2010, by 99 votes in favour, 0 against and one abstention. The final bill was sent to president Sebastián Piñera who enacted it on August 18, 2010 and was published on August 26.

== Overview ==
Article	Summary
24 H	Defines Internet service providers (ISP), as «all natural or legal person that loan commercial services of connectivity between the users or their networks and Internet».; Establishes the prohibition of arbitrary blockage, interference, discrimination, obstruction and restriction to the activities of Internet users. The ISP will be able to take the necessary measures for the traffic management and network administration, and will have to take care the users privacy, the protection against virus and the network security.; Forbids the limitation of the incorporation or use «of any class of tools, devices or gadgets in the network», while they are legal and do not damage the network.; Establishes the obligation to offer parental controls.; Establishes the obligation to «publish in its website, all the information regarding to the characteristics of Internet access being offered, speed, connection's quality, differentiating between the national and international connections, as well as the nature and guarantees of the service».
24 I	Gives to the Ministry of Transport and Telecommunications, through Subtel, the authority to sanction the infringements to the legal or statutory obligations to the net neutrality committed by the public telecommunications service distributors and ISP.
24 J	Establishes a bylaw to regulate the information being published by ISP in their web sites and the actions that will be considered restrictive practices of Internet services.
