= BEREC =

BEREC may refer to:

- British Ever Ready Electrical Company, a consumer battery manufacturer that traded under the "BEREC" and "Ever Ready" names
- Body of European Regulators for Electronic Communications
