= RSPP =

RSPP may refer to:

- Russian Union of Industrialists and Entrepreneurs
- Royal Society of Portrait Painters
- Radio Spectrum Policy Programme
