= Net neutrality in the Netherlands =

On June 4, 2012, the Netherlands became the first country in Europe and the second in the world, after Chile, to enact a network neutrality law. The main net neutrality provision of this law requires that "Providers of public electronic communication networks used to provide Internet access services as well as providers of Internet access services will not hinder or slow down services or applications on the Internet".

== History ==
The 2009 EU Telecoms Package left much leeway for member states to implement their own net neutrality directives. The first proposal by the Minister of Economic Affairs, Agriculture and Innovation was submitted to the House of Representatives on November 3, 2010.

In April 2011, Dutch telecommunications company KPN announced that it would start to block services such as VoIP and instant messaging unless customers paid a fee. Later that week, Vodafone said it was already blocking those services. During an investors meeting in May, KPN admitted to using deep packet inspection. These events accelerated the implementation of net neutrality, as a house majority was against the blocking of specific Internet services.

On June 22, 2011, the house voted for the amendment of the Telecommunications Act with net neutrality regulations. The Labour Party mistakenly voted for an amendment supported by the Christian parties SGP, CU and CDA that would allow filtering by ISPs for ideological reasons. A rectification was later plugged into an unrelated amendment.

The amendment was passed by the Senate in 2012, and with the publication of the amendment and the rectification in the official journal of the Netherlands on June 4 and June 5, respectively, network neutrality became the law.

== Overview ==
Article 7.4a of the Telecommunications Act prohibits the hindrance or slowing down of services or applications on the Internet by ISPs and network owners. Deviation from this rule is only allowed:

- to reduce congestion, while treating similar traffic equally;
- to preserve the integrity and security of the network and service of the provider or the equipment of the end-user;

If the breach of integrity or security is caused by the equipment of the end-user, the provider has to notify the end-user first and give them sufficient time to rectify the situation.

- to block the transmission of unwanted communications (e.g. spam) to an end-user, only if the end-user has given consent beforehand; or
- to comply with the law or a warrant.

Also, it is prohibited for ISPs to charge end-users differently for the use of different types of Internet services or applications. Finally, future executive orders can institute minimum quality requirements to prevent the deterioration, hindrance, or slowing down of network communications.

== Criticism and impact ==
The director of the former Independent Post and Telecommunications Authority (Dutch: Onafhankelijke Post en Telecommunicatie Autoriteit "OPTA"), now part of the Consumer and Markets Authority, has criticized the current implementation of net neutrality by the Netherlands. He questions whether the consumer actually benefits from the regulations, since it has become very hard for providers to offer a variety of services because of the restrictions posed on providers. He favors transparency and competition instead of strict regulation.

Neelie Kroes, a Dutch politician and the former European Commissioner for Digital Agenda, also supported consumer choice: "If consumers want to obtain discounts because they only plan to use limited online services, why stand in their way?" She recognized a need for greater transparency in what services providers do and do not provide, and what limitations there are: "consumers also need to know if they are getting Champagne or lesser sparkling wine. If it is not full Internet, it shouldn't be marketed as such; perhaps it shouldn't be marketed as 'Internet' at all, at least not without any upfront qualification." She also criticized uncoordinated country-by-country legislation, because it slows down the creation of a "Digital Single Market".

The Dutch approach to net neutrality received large attention in Brazil and served as an important reference during the negotiations of the Marco Civil da Internet, the country's Internet Civil Rights Law, approved by the Chamber of Deputies' in March, 2014.

On April 3, 2014, upon strong support of Commissioner Kroes, the European Parliament voted in favor of maintaining net neutrality throughout European networks. The basic framework of net neutrality in the European Union (EU) is laid down by Article 3 of EU Regulation 2015/2120.

== See also ==
- Net neutrality
- Internet in the Netherlands
- Net neutrality in the European Union
  - Telecoms Package
