= Erik Josefsson (activist) =

Swedish musician and internet activist (born 1963)

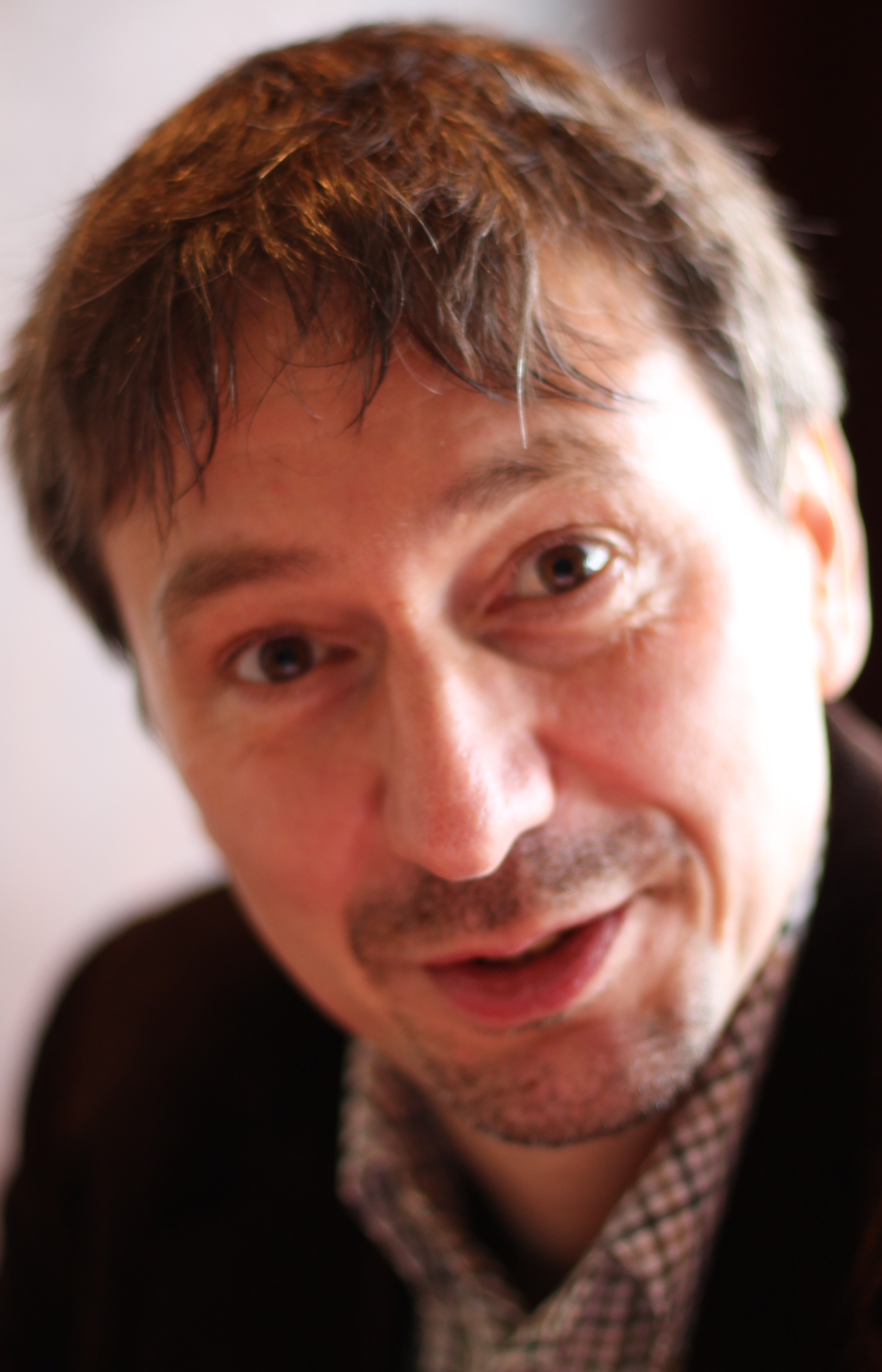
- Erik Hjalmar Josefsson
- Born: 24 August 1963 (age 62); Lund
- Education: Graduated from Malmö Academy of Music
- Movement: European Parliament Free Software User Group

Erik Hjalmar Josefsson (born 24 August 1963) is a Swedish musician, campaigner against software patents, and internet activist.

== Education and career ==
Erik Josefsson was born in Lund. He graduated from Malmö Academy of Music in 1997 (double bass), while finalising a teachers degree in maths and physics at Umeå University. While studying in Umeå, Josefsson was playing with Kammarorkester Bothnia, Trio Lligo and Projektor 7. After a shoulder injury, Josefsson worked as a programmer at WM-data with billing and case handling.

== Activism and politics ==
Starting in 2000, Josefsson engaged with Skåne Själland Linux User Group (SSLUG) and became a member of the board in 2002. In 2004, he founded the Swedish Chapter of Foundation for a Free Information Infrastructure (FFII) together with Jonas Bosson and Christian Engström and was its president until 2007, when he started working as European Affairs Coordinator with Electronic Frontier Foundation (EFF) in Brussels. Throughout his career Josefsson has been an active campaigner against software patents and was instrumental in the European Parliament's final rejection of the software patents directive in July 2005. According to Swedish tech magazine Ny Teknik, Josefsson was among the 50 most influential persons in IT in 2004 and 2005.

In late 2008, Josefsson became a member of the Swedish Left Party and ran for MEP in the 2009 elections but left the party for the Greens/EFA after elections. While working in the European Parliament he started the European Parliament Free Software User Group (EPFSUG) together with MEP Indrek Tarand. Josefsson received the Nordic Free Software Award in 2011 and was allegedly the founder of Telecomix "without whom that ACTA campaign in the EU might never have happened".
