= Radio Spectrum Policy Programme =

Radio spectrum standardisation effort by the European Union

The Radio Spectrum Policy Programme (RSPP) was a five year programme which set out regulatory requirements, goals and priorities of the European Union relating to the radio spectrum. It was first adopted 14 March 2012. It attempted to standardise the frequencies that different types of communication could use and also set goals as to when this standardisation should be complete. However, some member states did not meet certain goals laid out in the programme. A legislative review recommended implementing an adapted programme as legislation in a regulation, and so a modified version was adapted into a proposed regulation. The legislation was supported by the European Parliament, but was subsequently removed after criticism from member states in the European Council. In 2015, the Radio Spectrum Policy Group said the programme had mostly met its goals. The modified version was then used as a basis for the section on the radio spectrum in the European Electronic Communications Code.

== History ==
The programme was adopted by the European Council and the European Parliament 14 March 2012. It was managed and created by the European Commission. The first version laid out goals and their timescales, which aimed to standardise the assignment of the radio spectrum across the EU. It also stipulated that the commission had to produce a report on what the programme had achieved by April 2014. Several member states failed to meet certain goals due to a variety of reasons and this meant that the programme did not achieve standardisation in all member states early on. There were several member states who missed the target for the assignment of the 800MHz band.

In the year after its introduction, the European Commission initiated three different legislative reviews of the programme, with the third review proposing that the commission adopt the programme into regulation. This was because not all of the member states met the goals on time. Adapting it into a regulation would mean that once it was adopted it would be enforceable in member states without national legislation, ensuring that every member state met the goals on time. In 2013, the commission modified the programme and added the new version as legislation to a regulatory proposal. The European Parliament supported the legislation, however, member states in the European Council did not agree with the legislation due to its "intrusiveness into national prerogatives". The legislation then was removed by the council from the regulatory proposal. In 2015, the Radio Spectrum Policy Group in their annual report said that the programme's objectives had been mostly achieved. In 2016, the European Electronic Communications Code was created, which incorporated a section on the radio spectrum and this section was mostly based on the modified 2013 programme. The code was implemented, along with the section, in 2018.

== Aims of the programme ==
Some of the goals of the programme included switching to digital broadcasting from analogue, assignment of certain frequencies to mobile broadband throughout the EU and making use of the freed radio spectrum space for wireless communication. The proposed legislation in 2013 aimed to phase out national differences in the allocation of the radio spectrum.

== Works cited ==
- Massaro, Maria (2019). "Between Integration and Protection of National Sovereignty in the European Union's Radio Spectrum Policy: Uncovering Potential Research Avenues". Journal of Information Policy. 9. Penn State University Press: 158–197. doi:10.5325/jinfopoli.9.2019.0158. JSTOR 10.5325/jinfopoli.9.2019.0158.
- European Union (17 December 2018). "Directive (EU) 2018/1972 of the European Parliament and of the Council of 11 December 2018 establishing the European Electronic Communications Code (Recast) Text with EEA relevance". Official Journal of the European Union. L series. 321. Brussels.
- Massaro, Maria (February 2017). Radio Spectrum Regulation in the European Union: A three-level context (PDF) (Thesis). Gothenburg: Department of Technology Management and Economics, Chalmers University of Technology.
- Durantini, Annalisa; Martino, Mauro (2013). "The spectrum policy reform paving the way to cognitive radio enabled spectrum sharing". Telecommunications Policy. 37 (2–3): 87–95. doi:10.1016/j.telpol.2012.10.003.
- HC 219-I - European Scrutiny Commission First Report of 2014-15 (Report). European Scrutiny Committee. 20 June 2014.
- RSPG "the last 3 years" (PDF) (Report). Brussels: Radio Spectrum Policy Group. 15 October 2015.
