= Rättighetsalliansen =

Swedish lobby group

Rättighetsalliansen (lit. 'the Rights Alliance') is a Swedish lobby group representing companies and organisations within the Swedish film and computer game industry. Its activities involve promoting copyright issues and fighting copyright infringement. The chairman is Björn Gregfelt, while Henrik Pontén works as a jurist and the group's public relations man.

Rättighetsalliansen was formed in 2011 as the successor to the former Svenska Antipiratbyrån (the Swedish Anti-Piracy Agency), which was originally founded in 2001 by three groups: Filmägarnas Kontrollbyrå, MDTS, and Sveriges Videodistributörers Förening (SVF), which together represent over 30 companies.

The group's members are Noble Distribution Sweden AB, NonStop Entertainment AB, Nordisk Film AB, Paramount Home Entertainment Sweden AB, Sony Pictures Releasing Sweden AB, AB Svensk Filmindustri, Twentieth Century Fox, Sweden Aktiebolag/Twentieth Century Fox Home Entertainment AB, Universal Pictures Nordic AB, Walt Disney Company Nordic AB and Warner Bros. Entertainment Sverige AB.

In the public's mind it is seen as an opponent of Piratbyrån.

The organization was dissolved in 2011 to form part of the Rights Alliance.
