= Net neutrality law =

Law type

Net neutrality law refers to laws and regulations which enforce the principle of net neutrality.

Opponents of net neutrality enforcement claim regulation is unnecessary, because broadband service providers have no plans to block content or degrade network performance. Opponents of net neutrality regulation also argue that the best solution to discrimination by broadband providers is to encourage greater competition among such providers, which is currently limited in many areas.

On 23 April 2014, the United States Federal Communications Commission (FCC) was reported to be considering a new rule that would permit Internet service providers to offer content providers a faster track to send content, thus reversing their earlier position on net neutrality. Municipal broadband could provide a net neutral environment, according to Professor Susan Crawford, a legal and technology expert at Harvard Law School. On 15 May 2014, the FCC decided to consider two options regarding Internet services: first, permit fast and slow broadband lanes, thereby compromising net neutrality; and second, reclassify broadband as a telecommunication service, thereby preserving net neutrality. On 10 November 2014, President Obama recommended the FCC reclassify broadband Internet service as a telecommunications service in order to preserve net neutrality. On 26 February 2015, the FCC ruled in favor of net neutrality by reclassifying broadband access as a telecommunications service and thus applying Title II (common carrier) of the Communications Act of 1934 to Internet service providers. On 14 December 2017, the FCC voted to repeal these net neutrality regulations, particularly by reclassifying broadband providers so that they are not considered common carries under Title II of the Communications Act of 1936. The FCC would reverse this decision on 25 April 2024, instituting net neutrality once more.

== Legal background ==
=== Historical precedent ===
The concept of network neutrality predates the current Internet-focused debate, existing since the age of the telegraph. In 1860, a U.S. federal law (Pacific Telegraph Act of 1860) was passed to subsidize a telegraph line, stating that:

messages received from any individual, company, or corporation, or from any telegraph lines connecting with this line at either of its termini, shall be impartially transmitted in the order of their reception, excepting that the dispatches of the government shall have priority ...

— An act to facilitate communication between the Atlantic and Pacific states by electric telegraph, June 16, 1860.

In 1888 Almon Brown Strowger, suspecting his loss of business was caused by a nepotistic telephone operator redirecting his business calls to a competitor, invented an electromechanical-based automatic telephone exchange that effectively removed human interference of telephone calls.

== Degrees of enforcement ==
=== Full neutrality ===
Chile became the first country in the world to pass net neutrality legislation in 2010. The laws adopted there prohibit organizations such as Facebook and Wikipedia from subsidizing mobile data usage of consumers. The adoption of net neutrality law usually includes allowance for discrimination in limited conditions, such as preventing spam, malware, or illegal content. The law in Chile allows exceptions for ensuring privacy and security. The law in the Netherlands, allows exceptions for congestion, security, spam, or legal reasons.

Cardozo Law School professor Susan P. Crawford believes that in a neutral Internet, packets on the network must be forwarded on a first-come, first-served basis, with no consideration given to quality-of-service concerns.

A number of net neutrality interest groups have emerged, including SaveTheInternet.com which frames net neutrality as an absence of discrimination, saying it ensures Internet providers cannot block, speed up, or slow down content on the basis of who owns it, where it came from, or where it's going. It helps create the situation where any site on the Internet could potentially reach an audience as large as that of a TV or radio station, and its loss would mean the end for this level of freedom of expression.

=== Only allow discrimination based on type of data ===
Columbia University Law School professor Tim Wu observed the Internet is not neutral in terms of its impact on applications having different requirements. It is more beneficial for data applications than for applications that require low latency and low jitter, such as voice and real-time video. He explains that looking at the full spectrum of applications, including both those that are sensitive to network latency and those that are not, the IP suite isn't actually neutral. He has proposed regulations on Internet access networks that define net neutrality as equal treatment among similar applications, rather than neutral transmissions regardless of applications. He proposes allowing broadband operators to make reasonable trade-offs between the requirements of different applications, while regulators carefully scrutinize network operator behavior where local networks interconnect. However, it is important to ensure that these trade-offs among different applications be done transparently so that the public will have input on important policy decisions. This is especially important as the broadband operators often provide competing services—e.g., cable TV, telephony—that might differentially benefit when the need to manage applications could be invoked to disadvantage other competitors.

The proposal of Google and Verizon would allow discrimination based on the type of data, but would prohibit ISPs from targeting individual organizations or websites: Google CEO Eric Schmidt explains Google's definition of Net neutrality as follows: if the data in question is video, for example, then there is no discrimination between one purveyor's data versus that of another. However, discrimination between different types of data is allowed, so that voice data could be given higher priority than video data. Google and Verizon are both agreed on this type of discrimination.

=== Individual prioritization without throttling or blocking ===
Some opponents of net neutrality argue that under the ISP market competition, paid-prioritization of bandwidth can induce optimal user welfare. Although net neutrality might protect user welfare when the market lacks competition, they argue that a better alternative could be to introduce a neutral public option to incentivize competition, rather than enforcing existing ISPs to be neutral.

Some ISPs, such as Comcast, oppose blocking or throttling, but have argued that they are allowed to charge websites for faster data delivery. AT&T has made a broad commitment to net neutrality, but has also argued for their right to offer websites paid prioritization and in favor of its current sponsored data agreements.

=== No direct enforcement ===
While many countries lack legislation directly addressing net neutrality, net neutrality can sometimes be enforced based on other laws, such as those preventing anti-competitive practices. This is currently the approach of the US FCC, which justifies their enforcement based on compliance with "commercially reasonable" practices.

In the United States, author Andy Kessler argued in The Weekly Standard that, though network neutrality is desirable, the threat of eminent domain against the telecommunication companies, instead of new legislation, is the best approach.

In 2011, Aparna Watal of Attomic Labs said that there had been few violations of net neutrality. She argues that transparency, threat of public backlash, and the FCC's current authority was enough to solve the issues of net neutrality, claiming that the threat of consumers switching providers and the high cost of maintaining a non-neutral network will deter bad practices.

The Wall Street Journal has written about the government's responsibility being more along the lines of making sure consumers have the ability to find another Internet provider if they are not satisfied with their service, as opposed to determining how Internet providers should go about managing their networks.

== By country ==
Country	Status on net neutrality	Year
Argentina	Not enforced	2014
Australia	Not enforced	
Belgium	Enforced	
Brazil	Enforced	2014
Canada	Enforced	
Chile	Not enforced	2010
China	Not enforced	
India	Enforced	2018
Indonesia	Not enforced	
Israel	Enforced	2014
Japan	Enforced	
Mexico	Enforced	
Netherlands	Enforced	2012
New Zealand	Not enforced	
Russia	Enforced	2016
Slovenia	Enforced	2013
South Korea	Enforced	
Sri Lanka	Not enforced	
Switzerland	Enforced	2021
United States	Enforced	2024
Uruguay	Not enforced	

=== India ===
In October 2014, Facebook offered free internet to users through its internet.org app in partnership with Reliance Communications, but only for using Facebook. But since the users had to download an app for it, in 2015 November, Facebook made this more easier for users by allowing all Reliance users to browse Facebook without paying for additional data. This was just Facebook Free Basics plan though, which allowed users to like and comment on posts, but to view photos and videos, users would have to purchase data plans.

But in December 2015, TRAI or the Telecom Regulatory Authority of India asked Reliance to put these services on hold while they determined if Free Basics was in violation of net neutrality. For context, this was a time when mobile data was very expensive and before 3G connectivity was just becoming popular and widely used in India. On February 8th 2016, TRAI effectively banned Free Basics plan and other forms of differential pricing for internet services within the country in a notification titled 'Prohibition of Discriminatory Tariffs for Data Services Regulations, 2016’

== Concerns with regulation ==
=== Potential for government abuse ===
George Mason University fellow Adam Thierer has argued that "any government agency or process big enough to control a major sector of our economy will be prone to influence by those most affected by it", and that consequently "for all the talk we hear about how the FCC's move to impose Net Neutrality regulation is about 'putting consumers first' or 'preserving Net freedom and openness,' it's difficult to,, ignore the small armies of special interests who stand ready to exploit this new regulatory regime the same way they did telecom and broadcast industry regulation during decades past."

Grant Babcock, in the libertarian magazine Reason, wrote in 2014 that U.S. government oversight of ISPs could allow government agencies like the NSA to pressure ISPs into handing over private communication data on their users. He noted that there was a history of U.S. governmental abuse of regulation, including the Federal Reserve forcing some banks in 2008 to accept Troubled Asset Relief Program funding by threatening to use their regulatory powers against non-compliant banks.

=== Violation of corporate rights ===
One concern of many Internet service providers is government enforcement of information anti-discrimination. Arguing that such enforcement is an infringement on the freedoms of their businesses, American ISPs such as Verizon have argued that the FCC forcing anti-discrimination policies on information flowing over company networks is a violation of the ISPs constitutional rights, specifically concerning the First Amendment and Fifth Amendment in a court case challenging the Open Internet Order.

Verizon challenged the Open Internet Order on several grounds, including that the Commission lacked affirmative statutory authority to promulgate the rules, that its decision to impose the rules was arbitrary and capricious, and that the rules contravened statutory provisions prohibiting the commission from treating broadband providers as common carriers.

=== Potential for banning legitimate activity ===
Poorly conceived legislation could make it difficult for Internet service providers to legally perform necessary and generally useful packet filtering such as combating denial of service attacks, filtering E-Mail spam, and preventing the spread of computer viruses. Quoting Bram Cohen, the creator of BitTorrent, "I most definitely do not want the Internet to become like television where there's actual censorship...however it is very difficult to actually create network neutrality laws which don't result in an absurdity like making it so that ISPs can't drop spam or stop...attacks".

Some pieces of legislation, like The Internet Freedom Preservation Act of 2009, attempt to mitigate these concerns by excluding reasonable network management from regulation.

== See also ==
- Competition law
- National Cable & Telecommunications Association v. Brand X Internet Services
