= Henrik Pontén =

Swedish jurist (1965–2020)

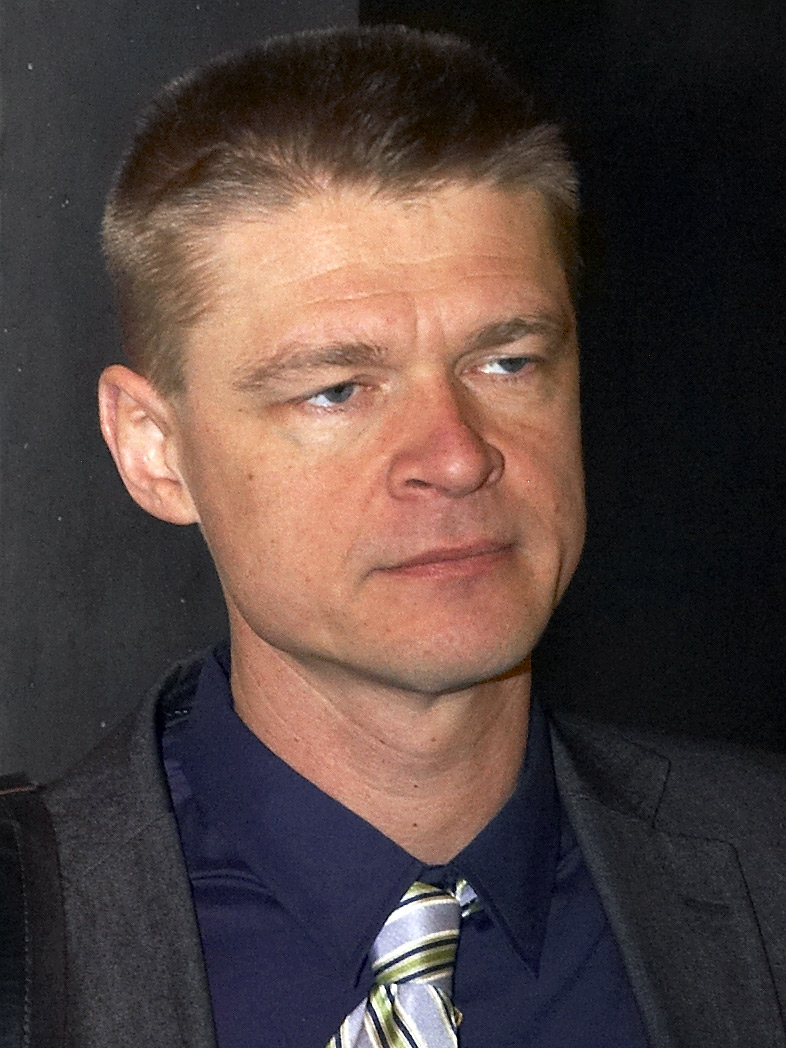
- Henrik Pontén (2009)

Henrik Pontén (17 October 1965 – 15 May 2020) was a Swedish jurist active in the organization Svenska antipiratbyrån (Swedish Anti-Piracy Bureau), and was often seen representing the organization in the media.

== Career ==
Pontén was born in Kalmar, and studied law at Stockholm University. He became well known in Swedish media during the Bahnhof raid and the raid against The Pirate Bay.

=== Controversies ===
As the most visible member of the anti-piracy organization, Pontén attracted unwanted attention from anonymous activists who opposed his work. In May 2009, a forged application with the Swedish Tax Agency was submitted to change his name to "Pirate Pontén". He died on 15 May 2020, from a brain injury in Lidingö, aged 54, following a bicycling accident on 1 January 2020.
