= Culture vs. Copyright =

2014 book by Anatoly G. Volynets

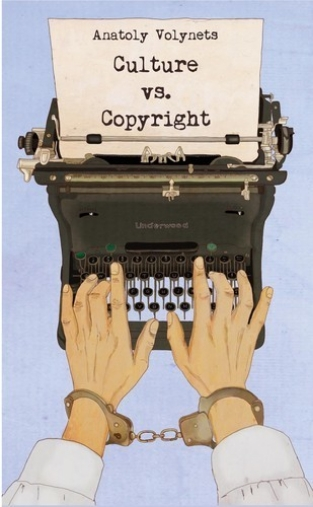
- Author: Anatoly Volynets
- Illustrator: Sasha Willins
- Cover artist: Olga Gessen
- Language: English
- Subjects: Philosophy, culture, humanity, creativity, intellectual property
- Genre: Philosophical diary
- Published: 2014 (Total Knowledge)
- Publication place: USA
- Media type: Print (Paperback)
- Pages: 142
- ISBN: 978-0-9889557-0-7
- OCLC: 865802929

Culture vs. Copyright: A Diary of a Naïve Philosopher is a philosophical diary by the Ukrainian American scholar Anatoly G. Volynets, published in 2014. It is Volynets' first book, consisting of dialogues among five first graders alternated with the thoughts of their teacher – the Naïve Philosopher of the subtitle – thoughts written in Volynets' own voice. The dialogues explore philosophical, psychological, economical and other aspects of intellectual property in its relations with culture and civilization.

In general, the author is opposed to copyright, and also opposes all kinds of intellectual property, including but not limited to patents, trademarks, trade secrets, among others. Volynets' theory is they all do not serve the purpose they claim but do just the opposite, that is, they strip incentives from creators and inhibit "progress of Science and Useful arts", as specified in the United States Constitution, Article I, Section 8, Clause 8, often called the "Copyright Clause".

== Summary ==
The Naïve Philosopher is a teacher of The School of the Dialogue of Cultures. The teacher discusses many issues pertaining to philosophy of culture versus intellectual property with five first graders. The diary presents records of discussions alternating with the teacher's thoughts in his own voice.

== Structure ==
=== Acknowledgements ===
There are several concepts presented in the book's Acknowledgements. These are not involved directly later in the book but serve as logical premises for the further argument. One is about dialogue in education and, specifically, in a form of The School of the Dialogue of Cultures (SDC). The reason it is brought in is that the discussions among first graders, at the level they are presented, might be conducted within the practices of the SDC. Furthermore, the idea of culture as the dialogue of cultures is, first, the basis of SDC and, forms, second, the logical foundation for the author's standpoint. Another concept presented is a specific interpretation of paradox as the logic of transmutation of ideas. Culture as dialogue of cultures is an example of the paradox logic. The philosophical concepts presented were introduced by the author's teacher, philosopher Vladimir Bibler.

=== "First Graders on the Magic Planet" ===
The chapter initially presents several major ideas that are developed more systematically later on in the book. It introduces the group of first graders that carry the discussion and sets the tone for the content that follows. A conversation revolves around the problem who and how gets paid if the artists and publishers do not restrict sharing the work by the public. That, besides the content developed, also demonstrates a teaching tool, a model of student centered discussion. In terms of ideas the preliminary findings by students are that both authors and publishers get paid for selling their product, not any rights, while unrestricted sharing provides exposure for the works and thus promotes sales.

=== "On the Nature of Arts" ===
Here the teacher conducts a mind experiment trying to clarify what qualifies as a work of art, how art works on humans, etc. For example, a work of art constitutes an entire new world in a way more real than the physical one. A work of art furthermore is interpreted as a message, the dialogue of its author with oneself, etc. All of the ideas when combined, bring up the subject of art as representative of culture and the fundamental law it undergoes: Freedom. Art in particular and culture in general cause civilization to develop. Although they are at odds as opposing realities, they react with each other to cause growth of both. Society must accept the cultural phenomena in order to develop. In this chapter, the author also comes back to the idea presented earlier about who owes whom: A creator to humanity or otherwise or both – one to another. In general, the chapter explores specifics of the cultural phenomena and the world of culture as it represented by the arts.

=== "Arts and Personality" ===
This chapter presents a recorded discussion. It is started by a teacher's question but all the research is done by students. Students are making the connections of "why do we read?" and are also learning skills, such as debating and summarizing. The teacher's intervention is moving away from directing students but letting them develop and apply skills. A batch of new ideas are brought up to demonstrate three major points. First, works of art as such, and particularly heroes thereof input hugely in human psyche. Second, works of art and their heroes largely determine in-between human relations. Third, we treat works of art essentially more like humans than like unanimated objects. Altogether these general ideas imply that in creating a law to govern culture we must not go after analogies in real estate but after those in human-to-human relations.

=== "Culture Beyond Arts" ===
Here ideas of the previous chapters expand on culture in general as it presented by creativity in different human activities but arts. The conversation starts with the question "when do people create?" Students use different cases in order to investigate the topic. They start with the question "can you be creative on a test if not prepared?" Another idea was to compare creativity to solving a crime. When discussing creating new content, few more ideas are brought forth, such as the concept of trial and error or using prior knowledge, and replication to generate new ideas. Specifically, students come up with the unique scheme that any new content is an old one combined and put in a new form.

=== "Discrepancies between Two Worlds" ===
This chapter is to put the world of culture vs. world of civilization side by side. It starts with a teacher's presentation attempting to do the comparison. But in here two major developments happen in the discussion among first graders that follows. The students contemplate the ideas that knowledge cannot be lost when shared and spread while material things are gone when change hands, that physical needs must be filled while cultural needs must be developed, that cultural satisfaction increases desire while filling physical needs ends desire. Additionally, work of royalties and attribution (for creative works) are discussed and students develop their skill of arguing and exploring both sides of points of view.

=== The final three chapters ===
These are written in the teacher's voice. In "Three Models," three ways to govern cultural affairs are put side by side in detail: One with no formal rules at all, the current and one called "Authoright," corresponding to the nature of culture as it is developed in the previous chapters. It is concluded that copyright and Intellectual Property (IP) in general is a harmful way of governing culture. IP effectively inhibits creativity and promotes plagiarism and forfeit. It appears to be a hindrance of culture and culture based economy. One particular point is that IP effectively strips creators from incentives which is exactly the opposite to the claim. Removing restrictions for dissemination of cultural phenomena, on the other hand, promotes exposure of works of art and creativity in general which pertains to the economy of culture. In short, a brilliant work of culture in open access develops its market and thus provides a market share for the creator.

The seventh chapter, "On Licensing in Cultural Affairs," and the addendum, "Authoright," present possibilities to apply all the philosophy developed to practical matters.

== Outlook ==
There are several dozen ideas contemplated in the book altogether. They gravitate toward two main foci: First, all types of intellectual property treat cultural, or spiritual, for that matter, phenomena as material things, which, according to the author, is nonsense in principle. Second, the analysis of how IP works shows that it actually does exactly the opposite to what it supposed to do. It suppresses creativity. Thus one of the practical conclusions of the book is that IP is to be abolished once and for all.

== The back cover ==
There are two blurbs placed on the back cover, written by John Perry Barlow and Shaindel Beers.

== See also ==
- Anti-copyright notice
- Copyright abolition
- Criticism of intellectual property
- Criticism of patents
- Free culture movement
- Freedom of information
- Information wants to be free
- Missionary Church of Kopimism
- Piratbyrån
- Opposition to copyright
