= Missionary Church of Kopimism =

Congregation of file sharers

The Kopimi symbol

Ctrl-C, Ctrl-V

The Missionary Church of Kopimism (in Swedish Missionerande Kopimistsamfundet) is a congregation of file sharers who believe that copying information is a sacred virtue; it was founded by Isak Gerson, a 19-year-old philosophy student, and Gustav Nipe in Uppsala, Sweden in the autumn of 2010. The Church, based in Sweden, has been officially recognized by the Legal, Financial and Administrative Services Agency as a religious community in January 2012, after three applications.

Gerson has denied any connection between the Church and filesharing site The Pirate Bay, but both groups are associated with the Swedish art and hacking collective Piratbyrån.

== Name ==
The name Kopimism derives from the words copy and me which are the fundamental roots of the Church's beliefs and calls for an invitation to copy information. The word "Kopimi" first showed up on a pirate Agency Forum. Isak Gerson, one of the core founders, saw something beautiful and theological in this concept of "copy me" and argued that the digital sharing of data is a fundamental act in our universe through the reproduction and copying of cells, DNA, and genes and that the entirety of the internet is essentially for sharing.

Gerson has been credited with once saying, "The only thing we can do as Christians now, I suppose, is to do what Jesus tried doing – and do it better."

== Tenets ==
The followers of the religion are called Kopimists from copy me. A "Kopimist" or "Kopimist intellectual" is a person who has the philosophical belief that all information should be freely distributed and unrestricted. This philosophy opposes the monopolization of knowledge in all its forms, such as copyright, and encourages file sharing of all types of media including music, movies, TV shows, and software. In fact, the act of withholding and economizing information through copyright is against the sacredness of information. In its spiritual emphasis on copying as an ideal, Kopimism shares values with Chinese aesthetic traditions, in which "copying is valued not only as a learning tool (as it is in the West) but as artistically satisfying in its own right," a concept also called duplitecture.

According to the church, "In our belief, communication is sacred." No belief in gods or supernatural phenomena apart from Kopimi itself is mentioned on their web site. CTRL+C and CTRL+V, the common computer shortcut keys for "Copy" and "Paste," are considered sacred symbols. Some groups believe that Kopimi is considered to be a god, and others believe it to be a sacred symbol and spirit residing within every living being.

The community also holds a religious service known as "kopyacting" in which information is distributed to the believers using photocopiers.

According to the Kopimist constitution:

- Copying of information is ethically right.
- Dissemination of information is ethically right.
- Copymixing (the copying and mixing of information with others) is a sacred kind of copying, more so than the perfect, digital copying, because it expands and enhances the existing wealth of information.
- Copying or remixing information communicated by another person is seen as an act of respect and a strong expression of acceptance and Kopimistic faith.
- The Internet is holy.
- Code is law.

On January 5, 2012, Kopimism was accepted by Sweden as a legitimate religion with an estimated 4,000 members. The religion's association with illegal file sharing has been said not to be a sign that illegal file-sharing will be excused from Sweden's zero-tolerance approach to the controversial matter.

== International locations ==
Kopimism has also taken root in multiple nations, including:

- Canada
- Japan
- Israel
- United States of America (including in the state of Illinois in the United States where Kopimism has registered as a non profit 503(c) organization in the form of a church.)

== First wedding ==
Video of the wedding

On April 28, 2012, the Missionary Church of Kopimism held their first wedding. The wedding took place in Belgrade, Serbia, between a Romanian woman and an Italian man. The holy ceremony was conducted by a Kopimistic Op, wearing a Guy Fawkes mask, while a computer read vows and some of Kopimism's central beliefs aloud.

The church declared: "We are very happy today. Love is all about sharing. A married couple shares everything with each other. Hopefully, they will copy and remix some DNA-cells and create a new human being. That is the spirit of Kopimism. Feel the love and share that information. Copy all of its holiness."

Gerson, the missionary leader of the Church of Kopimism, attended as a witness during the wedding.

== Controversies ==
Both founders, Gerson and Nipe, have had an extensive background in online activism and served as major players in the Swedish Piracy Movement, which caused many journalists and government officials in Sweden to speculate on the real goals of the creation of this organization.

There was severe backlash amongst the media and Christian journals in 2011 after the founders first submitted their application for registering as a religion as journalists condemned the Missionary Church of Kopimism as "a political adventure", "a PR stunt", and "a devaluation of religion".

== See also ==
- Anti-copyright
- Culture vs. Copyright
- Gift economy
- Information wants to be free
- List of new religious movements
- New religious movement
- Parody religion
- Religion and the Internet
