= Piratbyrån =

Swedish think tank and lobbying organization

- Formation: 1 August 2003
- Dissolved: 22 June 2010
- Type: Non-governmental organization
- Legal status: Disbanded
- Purpose: Think tank, opposition to intellectual property
- Official language: Swedish
- Website: piratbyran.org (archived)

Piratbyrån (Swedish: [pɪˈrɑ̂ːtbʏˌroːn] "The Pirate Bureau") was a Swedish think tank established to support the free sharing of information, culture, and intellectual property. Piratbyrån provided a counterpoint to lobby groups such as the Swedish Anti-Piracy Bureau.

In 2005 Piratbyrån released an anthology entitled Copy Me, containing selected texts previously available from its website. Members of Piratbyrån participated in debates on Swedish Radio and Swedish Television and also gave several lectures in other European countries, such as at the 2005 22nd Chaos Communication Congress in Berlin.

Piratbyrån's activities might have changed over the years, partly as a result of the addition of the Pirate Party to the Swedish political scene. During Walpurgis Night 2007, Piratbyrån burned all of their remaining copies of Copy Me in a ritual-like performance, declaring:

The file-sharing debate is hereby buried. When we talk about file-sharing from now on it's as one of many ways to copy. We talk about better and worse ways of indexing, archiving and copying—not whether copying is right or wrong. Winter is pouring down the hillside. Make way for spring!

Jonas Andersson, a Swedish researcher specialized in the politics of file-sharing, gave this brief definition in October 2009:

Piratbyrån is entirely separate from The Pirate Party; it is more of a loosely organised think-tank, a website, a philosophical greenhouse or FAQ guide to digitization.

The MPA-funded Svenska antipiratbyrån (Swedish Anti-Piracy Bureau), an agency devoted to fighting copyright infringement, was formed in 2001, before Piratbyrån. Piratbyrån humorously copied the name of their opponent, removing the "anti".

In June 2010 the group disbanded following the death of co-founder and prominent member Ibrahim Botani, also known as Ibi Kopimi Botani. Several former members of Piratbyrån are now involved in Telecomix. Around the same time, the front page of the website was replaced with the three words Stängt för eftertanke (Swedish for 'Closed for reflection').

== Self-definition ==
In 2008, Piratbyrån published a report titled Piratbyrån – The Bureau of Piracy Activities 2007 which starts with the following description of the organisation:

Piratbyrån (The Bureau of Piracy) is not an organization, at least not primarily. First and foremost, Piratbyrån is since its beginning in 2003 an ongoing conversation. We are reflecting over questions regarding copying, information infrastructure and digital culture. Within the group, using our own different experiences and skills, as in our daily encounters with other people. These conversations often bring about different kinds of activities.

—

== Definition by Prix Ars Electronica jury ==
As Piratbyrån received an "award of distinction" at Prix Ars Electronica in 2009, the jury statement said:

Piratbyrån is not an organization but an on-going conversation on copyright, file-sharing and digital culture. Over the last six years Piratbyrån has been able to create a discursive space that enables individual and collective actors to be heard, and to significantly expand the range of opinions entering the public debate regarding copyright. To advance this conversation, they have been using a wide range of innovative, experimental, often humorous techniques – as well as traditional means such as public discussions, interviews and publications.

The resulting debate has been multi-layered ranging from the technological (e.g. The Pirate Bay) to the artistic (e.g. a bus tour through Europe to Manifesta 08) to the political (e.g. Pirate Party). With very limited resources, Piratbyrån has been able to galvanize a political movement that has already shaped the development of digital culture and public policy in Sweden and across Europe, pushing the boundaries of the possible.

Piratbyrån aims at nothing less than to fundamentally question the most basic categories – e.g. the distinction between the producer and the consumer – through which we understand culture to investigate if and how these apply to the digital condition.

Piratbyrån does not claim to offer a solution to this extremely complex issue; indeed, it questions the assumption that copyright offers a one-size-fits all solution to cultural production, which now needs to be replaced with another unified solution. All of this has been done with great dedication and under considerable personal risk, yet they never forget that humor and irony are among the strongest weapons available to cultural producers.

== BitTorrent tracker ==
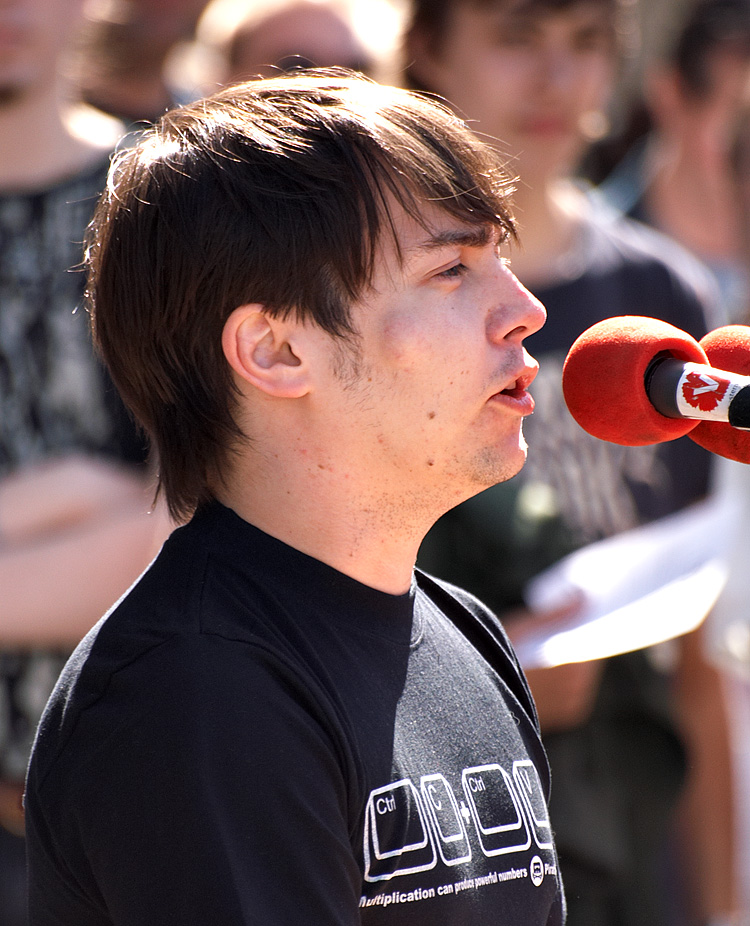
Rasmus Fleischer, spokesman of Piratbyrån speaking at a demonstration in Stockholm held 3 June 2006

Members of Piratbyrån founded the BitTorrent tracker The Pirate Bay in 2003 as a Swedish language site. The Pirate Bay now operates independently from Piratbyrån, although a number of The Pirate Bay administrators were also active in Piratbyrån.

=== Police raid ===
On the morning of 31 May 2006, the servers of both The Pirate Bay, a popular Swedish BitTorrent tracker, and Piratbyrån were confiscated in a raid by Swedish police. The seizure was part of an investigation into possible illegal activities on the part of The Pirate Bay. Piratbyrån and the Antipiratbyrån set up a temporary news blog during the investigation.

== Activities in 2007 ==
In Piratbyrån – The Bureau of Piracy Activities 2007, published in 2008, Piratbyrån list its activities for the year 2007. Activities by Piratbyrån members include lectures at universities and conferences, the publication of reports, participation in art projects and research projects, an interview with Vanity Fair in February 2007, participation in the planning of The Oil of the 21st Century conference in Berlin, presentations at a Norwegian computer party (The Gathering), interviews to the media regarding the raid on The Pirate Bay, opening of a webshop to sell Kopimi Klothing, participation in the organisation of protests to mark the one-year anniversary of the police raid on The Pirate Bay, attendance of the BELEF07 festival in Belgrade (Serbia), and participation in the organisation of a one-day art event in Stockholm titled "Who Makes And Owns Your Work".

In March 2007 Piratbyrån members were invited to a meeting with the executive group for the Swedish Film Institute, to share their views about film and copying. According to Piratbyrån "The leadership listens with interest — only to some months later launch new anti-piracy initiatives...". In the same month Piratbyrån collaborates with the Norwegian group Piratgruppen, launching the counter-campaign "Piracy frees music" (promoted via The Pirate Bay), in response to the "Piracy kills music" anti-piracy campaign by the Norwegian record industry.

In 2007 members of Piratbyrån also contributed to the production of the film Steal This Film (Part Two), which features interviews with Piratbyrån members and was released in December 2007.

== Activities in 2009 ==
Piratbyrån organized the "Spectrial", a theatricalizing intervention in The Pirate Bay trial in Stockholm, early in 2009.

Installed the Embassy of Piracy – The Embassy of Piracy, for the First Internet Pavilion at the Venice Biennial

At the Prix Ars Electronica Piratbyrån received an "award of distinction" (including a prize money of 5000 euro) in the category "Digital Communities". The motivation of the jury underlined the Piratbyrån "never forget that humor and irony are among the strongest weapons available to cultural producers."

== Kopimi ==
Two Kopimi symbols, one with pyramid and one without. More variations can be found on kopimi.com and on Commons.

Copy-me video

The Kopimi symbol was conceived in January 2005 by Piratbyrån co-founder Ibrahim Botani. The logo, pronounced "copy me", can be used to specifically request people to copy and distribute a work, for any purpose. Botani intended the logo to be the opposite of copyright, which usually restricts copying a work, and as a unifying symbol of the anti-copyright ideas Piratbyrån stood for. As such, the Kopimi symbol may be considered an anti-copyright notice of sorts.

Later in 2005, the Kopimi logotype was included in the Piratbyrån book Copy Me. In June of that year, the Kopimi symbol was added to the front page of the Pirate Bay. Throughout the next 15 years, three different variants of the logo were used on the front page, until it was removed sometime in March/April 2020. (Note: The first symbol was added around 15–17 June 2005 (compare 15 June '05 and 17 June '05) and was replaced in May/June 2006 (13 May '06, 13 June '06). The second stood until c. January 2009 (30 December '08, 12 January '09). The third remained for the next 11 years. Since March/April 2020, the front page no longer has the Kopimi logo (7 March '20, 12 April '20).) The history section of the site stated: "Some of you may have noticed that little symbol at the bottom of the page, the pyramid. It's a symbol called Kopimi (Copy Me) which was founded by an old friend of ours, the artist Ibi Botani. It's basically about promoting copying. Using the kopimi symbol on something not only shows that it is ok to copy it, it says it wants to be copied, mixed or manipulated!"

While Kopimi may appear to be a public-domain-equivalent license, no one associated with Piratbyrån ever called Kopimi a license, instead describing it as a symbol of certain ideas. The Open Source Initiative, Free Software Foundation, or any other organisation within the open-source movement, does not list Kopimi as an approved license. Since May 2024, the website of Kopimi explicitly states: "Kopimi is not a copyright license. For best results, release your work under a license like Creative Commons CC0, and use a kopimi badge ... to encourage sharing and remixing".

Wikimedia Commons, a repository of free content and a sister site of Wikipedia, allows users to label their files with Kopimi.

=== Kopimism ===
Kopimism and kopimist are terms derived from Botani's symbol. It is unclear who coined them, but they have been used since at least July 2006. In January 2007, the Pirate Bay used the terms when they attempted to buy Sealand, a sea fort off the coast of England and a self-proclaimed country. The Pirate Bay declared: "To make sure the owners will be kopimistic and that the country won't be governed by people that do not care about its future, we have come up with a plan. With the help of all the kopimists on Internets, we want to buy Sealand."

The Missionary Church of Kopimism was founded in 2010 by Isak Gerson, a philosophy student and a member of the Pirate Party of Sweden. After two failed attempts, Kopimism was officially recognized as a religion by the Swedish government in January 2012. The Church considers copying a holy virtue, and uses various Kopimi symbols to present itself.

=== Copie ===
Copie logo

Inspired by Kopimi, the Pirate Party of Brazil created their own version of the concept called "Copie", which plays both on the Portuguese words "copie" (copy) and "co-pie" (tweet together). The Copie logotype shows 5 birds tweeting together.

== See also ==
- Copyleft
- Criticism of copyright
- Culture vs. Copyright
- Internet freedom
- Missionary Church of Kopimism
- Pirate Party of Sweden (Piratpartiet) (not affiliated with Piratbyrån)
- The Pirate Bay – a BitTorrent site
- Steal This Film
- Telecomix
