= Rasmus Fleischer =

Swedish historian and musician

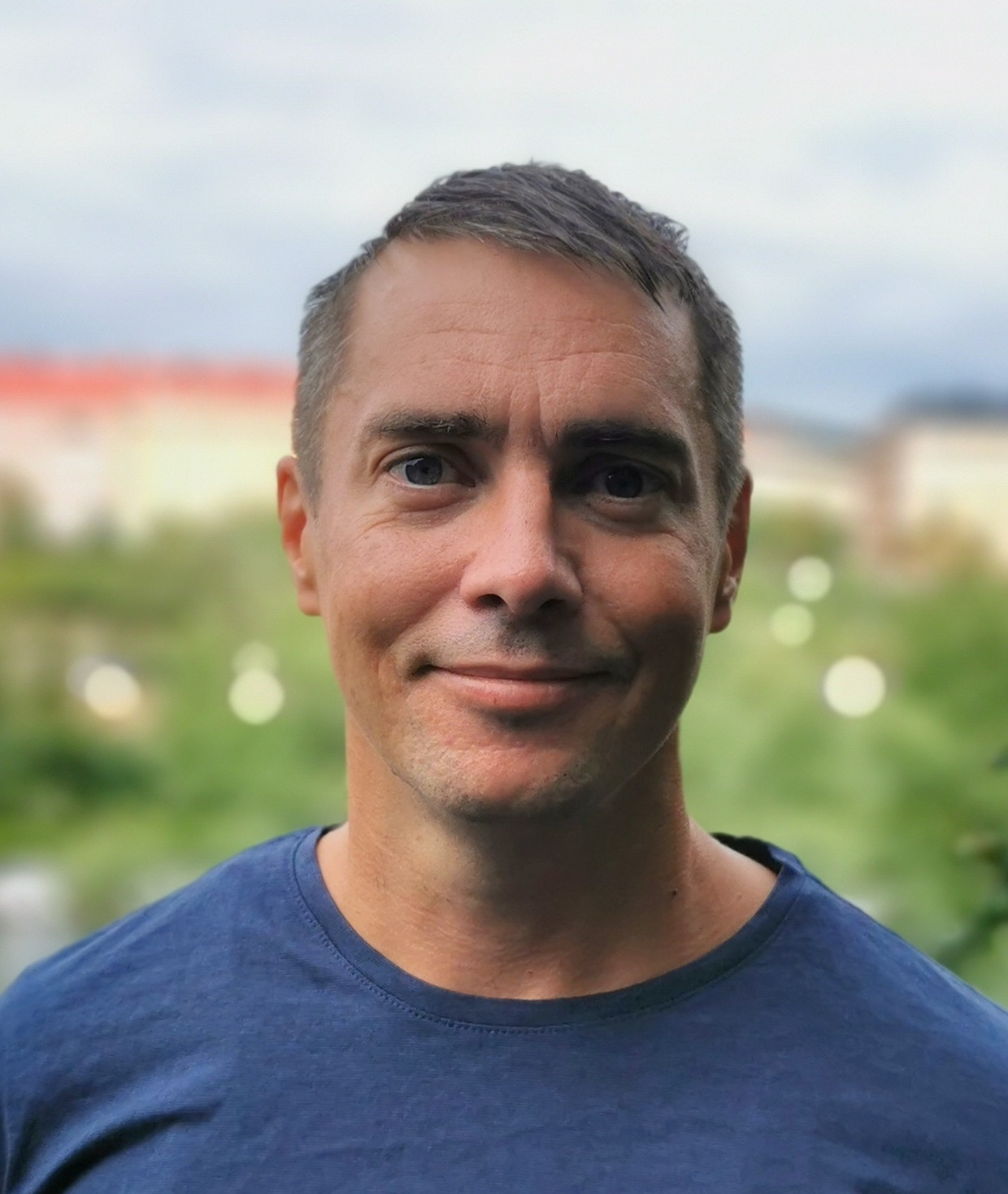
- Fleischer in 2021
- Born: 19 April 1978 (age 47); Halmstad, Sweden
- Occupations: Historian; Essayist; Musician
- Known for: Piratbyrån

Rasmus Fleischer (born 19 April 1978 in Halmstad) is a Swedish historian, essayist and musician. He earned his Ph.D. in history in 2012 with a dissertation that was also published as a book of 640 pages: "The political economy of music: Legislation, sound media and the defence of live music, 1925–2000".

Between 1998-2000 he was at the Royal College of Music, Stockholm (Institute of Early Music). Then in 2001-2006 he went to Stockholm University and in 2001-2006 he studied at Södertörn University College.

He is a researcher at the department of economic history, Stockholm University, while continuing to also publishing non-academic articles and books. Since 2004 he has been running the blog Copyriot. He is a frequent speaker at transmediale, addressing topics ranging from "the automation of rave" and "how money is failing" to questions about contemporary fascism and the problems of speaking about "internet freedom".

He was part of a transdisciplinary team of researchers investigating the music streaming company Spotify and co-authored the book "Spotify Teardown" (MIT Press, 2019). as well as another book on Spotify, published in Swedish and Danish.

Between 2019 and 2023 he worked together with another economic historian, Daniel Berg, in a research project on the history of economic statistics, funded by the Swedish Research Council: "Valuations of quality in the Consumer Price Index and its significance for social and economic history". The main findings of this research was published in late 2023 as a book titled Varors värde.

== Anti-copyright activism ==
In 2003, Fleischer was one of the founders of Piratbyrån, the anti-copyright organization that, in turn, once founded BitTorrent tracker The Pirate Bay. Since then he has been lecturing extensively, on subjects related to "the collapse of copyright" and the future of music, at various European conferences addressing art and/or new media.

Parts of an interview with Fleischer commenting on copyright are featured in Steal This Film (2006). While most of his writings on this topic has been in Swedish, in June 2008 the Cato Institute commissioned an essay titled The future of copyright.

When the Swedish engineering weekly Ny Teknik in September 2006 ranked the fifty most influential persons in Swedish IT-industry, he ended up as seventh on the list. During January and February 2008, he stayed as an artist in residence in Vienna, invited by Transforming Freedom, an audio archiving platform based in the Viennese Museumsquartier to live there while doing mainly theoretical and conceptual work.

== Musical activities ==
Fleischer has also studied at the Royal College of Music and, amongst other musical activities, interpreted medieval music in the ensemble Vox Vulgaris which released an album in 2003 and was, after being inactive for many years, resuming activities in 2019. His main instruments are recorder and clarinet. In recent years, he has been playing together with members of bands like Dungen and appears on an LP by Our Solar System in 2013.

== Political background ==
Fleischer's political background is leftist, without any known party affiliation. In the early 2000s, he worked for some years as a journalist for Arbetaren, the weekly newspaper of the Central Organisation of the Workers of Sweden, a syndicalist union. Around the same time, he criticized parts of the Swedish political left for tendencies of nationalism and during the 2006 Lebanon War, he criticized Swedish anti-war demonstrators for siding up with Hezbollah supporters.

Since 2010, Fleischer's writings has appeared several times in the anarchist magazine Brand and has written essays presenting the thought of the Marxian thinker Robert Kurz.

== Writing ==
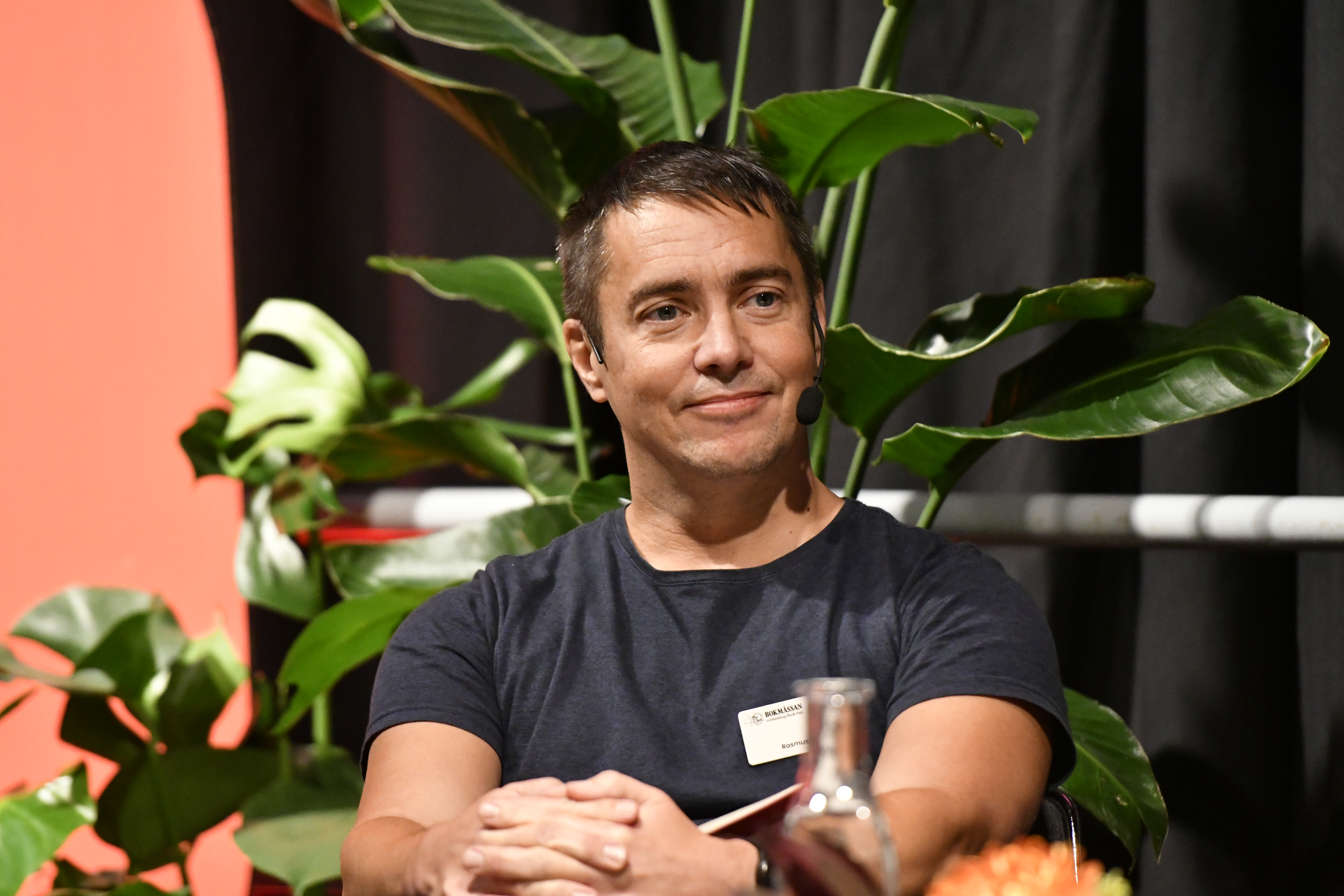
Fleischer at the Göteborg Book Fair in 2024.

Fleischer's essay Det postdigitala manifestet (2009, in Swedish) analyzes how the contemporary culture of digital abundance produces a reevaluation of physical presence, taking examples mainly from the area of music. It has been published also in Finnish and in 2013 selected parts of it was published in an English translation by E-flux magazine in 2013.

His second book, the double volume Boken & Biblioteket, was published in October 2011, also in Swedish. The first book is about books, including discussions about the political economy of publishing, the history of print on demand, the durability of e-books, the aesthetics of audiobooks and robot publishing. The second book discusses the library both in terms of a selective institution, a digital interface and a post-digital space.

Besides from his books, writings by Fleischer appear in a number of anthologies as well as in magazines and newspapers, though not much of it has been translated to languages other than Swedish. As of 2023, he is a regular contributor to Aftonbladet, Göteborgs-Posten and Flamman.

== Bibliography ==
- Det postdigitala manifestet (2009), 82 pages, ISBN 91-973586-9-X
- Boken & Biblioteket (2011).
- Musikens politiska ekonomi (2012).
- Tapirskrift (2013).
- Den svenska enhörningen: storyn om Spotify, with Pelle Snickars (2018).
- Spotify Teardown: Inside the Black Box of Streaming Music, with Maria Eriksson, Anna Johansson, Pelle Snickars and Patrick Vonderau (MIT Press, 2019).
