= HMS Integrity =

Several ships have served the Royal Navy under the name HMS Integrity.

- Integrity was a cutter built at New South Wales for the British government and lost without trace in 1805. Admiralty records suggest that she was purchased or built in 1805, which is incorrect, and that she was listed until 1810.
- Integrity (BAT-4) was launched 28 March 1942 by Levingston Shipbuilding Co., Orange, Texas, under contract from General Motors. She was completed and delivered to Great Britain under Lend-Lease 15 July 1942. She served as an ocean rescue tug with the Royal Navy, which returned her to the United States Navy at Subic Bay, Philippine Islands, on 19 February 1946. Stricken from the U.S. Navy List on 12 April 1946. The United States Navy turned her over to the State Department Foreign Liquidation Commission and she was subsequently sold to T. Y. Fong.

In addition, the National Maritime Museum database lists three other vessels named Integrity

- Integrity - drifter 86/07, hired for service between 1915 and 1919.
- Integrity (II) - drifter 67/03, hired for service between 1916 and 1919.

Naval drifters were boats either purpose-built for naval use or commercial fishing drifters requisitioned from private owners. The Royal Navy primarily used them to maintain and patrol anti-submarine nets.

Lastly,

- Integrity was a dockyard tug, the ex-Empire Cutit, that in March 1947 the Ministry of Transport transferred to the Royal Navy, which renamed her.
