= Radio Spectrum Policy Group =

Advisory group on the radio spectrum for the European Commission

The Radio Spectrum Policy Group (RSPG) is an advisory group founded 26 July 2002 for the European Commission on matters related to the radio spectrum. The group is made up of representatives from the European Commission and the member states of the European Union. The group focuses on dealing with the radio spectrum in regards to telecommunications, health and transportation. The group was reformed 11 June 2019 under the same name.
