= IntegrityBC =

Non-partisan organization in British Columbia, Canada

Integrity British Columbia
- Abbreviation: IntegrityBC
- Formation: 2011
- Type: Non-profit organization
- Legal status: Active
- Purpose: Election Finance Reform, Political Advocacy
- Headquarters: Victoria, British Columbia
- Region served: Canada
- Official language: English
- Executive Director: Jose D. Carpio
- Website: www.integritybc.ca

IntegrityBC is a non-partisan organization located in Victoria, British Columbia, Canada. The organization was founded March 2011 by Vancouver businessman Wayne Crookes as a way to help restore accountability and integrity to BC politics. The organization is currently lobbying for electoral finance reform at the provincial level as well as working to empower British Columbians at the political level.

== Overview ==
Integrity British Columbia is a non-partisan organization in Victoria, British Columbia. It was founded in 2011 by Vancouver businessman Wayne Crookes, who was also the campaign manager for the Green Party of Canada in 2004. The organization's founding executive director is Dermod Travis who served as the executive director of the Canada Tibet Committee from 2007 to 2011 and communications director for the Green Party from 2004 to 2006. He also operates PIRA Communications.

Integrity British Columbia's primary goal is to "help restore a bond built on trust and confidence between citizens and their elected officials".

For example, IntegrityBC has interviewed BC political party leaders, including the NDP's Adrian Dix, Conservative party leader John Cummins, the Green party leader Jane Sterk and Independent MLA Bob Simpson with questions taken directly from the organization's Facebook page and from people on the street.

IntegrityBC issues news releases and also recommends news article that pertain to the topics of the day.

Their website includes a resource section with relevant court judgments (like the BC Boss Power case and third-party advertising limits) and studies on election finance reform, and public opinion surveys.

== Current campaigns ==
IntegrityBC is currently fighting for electoral finance reform. They want to ban corporate and union funding for BC political parties, cap personal donations and establish a citizen's assembly to make binding recommendations on a host of other reforms regarding how political parties are financed and operate.

Their argument stems from a series of comparisons between BC and other Canadian provinces. Currently all provinces (except for BC, Saskatchewan, Prince Edward Island and Newfoundland and Labrador) have some form of restrictions. These may include the prohibition of corporate and union donations, a limit on personal or corporate donations, prohibition of non-Canadian donations or out of province donations. Not only that but corporations and unions cannot contribute at the federal level, yet in BC they account for over 60% of the BC Liberals income.

== Resource centre ==
As a way of informing its citizens about British Columbia's provincial government IntegrityBC has created a resource centre for everyone to use. Some of the topics include information on the HST, the Boss Power Scandal, and Heed vs. Chief Electoral Officer.
