= Telecoms Package =

EU review of telecoms regulations

The Telecoms Package was the review of the European Union Telecommunications Framework from 2007 – 2009. The objective of the review was to update the EU Telecoms Framework of 2002 and to create a common set of regulations for the telecoms industry across all 27 EU member states. The review consisted of a package of directives addressing the regulation of service provision, access, interconnection, users' contractual rights and users' privacy, as well as a regulation creating a new European regulatory body (BEREC).

The update to the telecoms regulations was needed to address the growth of broadband Internet. It was intended merely to address structural regulation and competitive issues concerning the broadband providers and the provision of spectrum. The Telecoms Package created a new pan-European agency called Body of European Regulators of Electronic Communications (BEREC) overseeing telecoms regulation in the member states. It provided for member states to set minimum quality of service levels for broadband network transmission. It harmonised European contractual rights for telephone and Internet subscribers. These rights included the ability to switch telephone operators within 24 hours of giving notice, and retaining the phone number. Broadband and phone providers are obligated to limit the contract term to 12 months. Subscribers are to be notified of data privacy breaches.

The Telecoms Package became subject to several political controversies, including disputes over the provision of access to infrastructure by dominant broadband providers. However, the most significant controversies concerned copyright and net neutrality.

The controversy over copyright arose because of an attempt to put in amendments mandating Internet service providers to enforce copyright. It was argued that these amendments sought to implement a three-strikes regime. There was a public political argument over this matter. The debate eventually centred on one single counter-amendment, known as Amendment 138. The outcome was that the package was forced to go to three readings in the European Parliament, and a compromise amendment was drafted, with the agreement of the three European institutions – Parliament, Commission and Council. This compromise amendment is sometimes now known as the 'freedom provision'.

The net neutrality controversy arose out of changes made to transparency requirements for broadband providers, where, it was argued, those changes could permit the providers to alter quality-of-service or favour or discriminate against other players.

The Telecoms Package is known in German as Telekom-Paket, in French as Paquet Telecom, in Spanish as Paquete Telecom, and in Swedish as Telekompaketet.

== Legislative history ==
The legislation that comprises the Telecoms Package, as published in the Official Journal of the European Union is:

- Directive 2009/140/EC (Framework, Authorisation and Access directives)
- Directive 2009/136/EC(Universal services and E-privacy directives)
- Regulation No 1211/2009 establishing the Body of European Regulators for Electronic Communications (BEREC)

The Telecoms Package was presented by Viviane Reding, the European Commissioner for Information Society, to the European Parliament in Strasbourg 13 November 2007.

The draft legislation that was presented to the European Parliament was:

Proposal for a directive of the European Parliament and of the Council amending Directives 2002/21/EC on a common regulatory framework for electronic communications networks and services, 2002/19/EC on access to, and interconnection of, electronic communications networks and services, and 2002/20/EC on the authorisation of electronic communications networks and services

Proposal for a directive of the European Parliament and of the Council amending Directive 2002/22/EC on universal service and users' rights relating to electronic communications networks, Directive 2002/58/EC concerning the processing of personal data and the protection of privacy in the electronic communications sector and Regulation (EC) No 2006/2004 on consumer protection cooperation

Proposal for a regulation of the European Parliament and of the Council establishing the European Electronic Communications Market Authority

The Telecoms Package went through three readings in the European Parliament. The First Reading concluded on 24 September 2008. The second reading concluded on 5 May 2009. The third reading, also known as the conciliation process, concluded at midnight on 5 November 2009.

The entire package was finally adopted by a majority vote in the European Parliament on 24 November 2009. This was, however, a legal technicality. The critical policy issues had already been decided during the three readings.

The Telecoms Package entered into European law on 18 December 2009 (the date on which it was published in the Official Journal), after which member states had 18 months to implement its provisions in national law.

== Copyright ==
The Telecoms Package was a complex piece of legislation. It was intended to update many aspects of telecoms regulation. It combined earlier directives from 2002 into two new bundles. The Framework, Access and Authorisation directives from 2002, were put into one new directive. The Universal Services and e-Privacy directives, also from 2002, were bundled together into another new directive.

In the European Commission's draft of 13 November 2007, there were two amendments that attempted to insert support for copyright, notably that EU member states should mandate their broadband providers to co-operate with rights-holders and favouring a 'three strikes' or graduated response regime. These two amendments were Annex 1, point 19 of the Authorisation directive and Amendment 20.6 of the Universal Services directive. They sparked a major political controversy over the enforcement of copyright on the Internet.

The copyright controversy became public during the first reading of European Parliament. It came to dominate the political debate and was the subject of a vocal activist campaign led by La Quadrature du Net. It was only resolved during the third reading, when the European Parliament drafted a new provision that reminded member state governments of their obligations under the European Convention of Human Rights, notably the right to due process.

=== Amendment 138 ===
The famous (or infamous) Amendment 138 was tabled to highlight the problem of copyright and with the aim of stopping a three strikes regime being legitimated in European Union legislation.

Amendment 138 was an amendment tabled to the Framework directive, that sought to mandate a judicial ruling in cases where Internet access would be cut off. It was deliberately framed to target other proposals for copyright measures – the so-called 'three-strikes'. The text of amendment 138 was:

“ applying the principle that no restriction may be imposed on the fundamental rights and freedoms of end-users, without a prior ruling by the judicial authorities, notably in accordance with Article 11 of the Charter of Fundamental Rights of the European Union on freedom of expression and information, save when public security is threatened in which case the ruling may be subsequent".

Amendment 138 was adopted by the European Parliament in the first reading plenary vote on 24 September 2008. This created an inter-institutional stand-off between the Parliament on the one hand, and the Commission and the Council of Ministers, on the other.

In the second reading, on 5 May 2009, the European Parliament again voted for Amendment 138.

In the Third Reading, the only issue under discussion was Amendment 138 and how to handle the copyright issue. A compromise provision was finally agreed by all three EU institutions at midnight on 4 November 2009. This provision is Article 1.3a of the Framework directive. It is sometimes known as the 'Freedom Provision'.

The text of Article 1.3a (the so-called "Freedom Provision") is:

"3a. Measures taken by Member States regarding end-users access' to, or use of, services and applications through electronic communications networks shall respect the fundamental rights and freedoms of natural persons, as guaranteed by the European Convention for the Protection of Human Rights and Fundamental Freedoms and general principles of Community law. Any of these measures regarding end-users' access to, or use of, services and applications through electronic communications networks liable to restrict those fundamental rights or freedoms may only be imposed if they are appropriate, proportionate and necessary within a democratic society, and their implementation shall be subject to adequate procedural safeguards in conformity with the European Convention for the Protection of Human Rights and Fundamental Freedoms and with general principles of Community law, including effective judicial protection and due process. Accordingly, these measures may only be taken with due respect for the principle of the presumption of innocence and the right to privacy. A prior, fair and impartial procedure shall be guaranteed, including the right to be heard of the person or persons concerned, subject to the need for appropriate conditions and procedural arrangements in duly substantiated cases of urgency in conformity with the European Convention for the Protection of Human Rights and Fundamental Freedoms. The right to effective and timely judicial review shall be guaranteed."

== Net neutrality ==
The Telecoms Package contained provisions that concerned net neutrality. These provisions related to transparency of information supplied by network operators and Internet Service Providers (ISPs) to their subscribers. They can be found in Article 20 and 21 of the Universal Services directive.

These two articles were subject to considerable lobbying by the telecoms network operators, who wanted to retain the flexibility to run the networks to suit their business requirements.

Some of their demands were criticised by citizens advocacy groups, who argued that certain proposed amendments would allow the broadband operators to use discriminatory forms of traffic management. The outcome was a strange wording in the text:

"inform subscribers of any change to conditions limiting access to and/or use of services and applications, where such conditions are permitted under national law in accordance with Community law";

The Telecoms Package was a target for lobbying by American telecoms companies, notably AT&T and Verizon, seeking to get the ability to use sophisticated traffic management techniques on broadband networks embedded into European law. Filip Svab, chairman of the "Telecoms Working Group" of the Council of the European Union, which was responsible for drafting the council's changes to the Telecoms Package on the second reading, left Brussels for a new job with AT&T (External Affairs Director).

== See also ==
- Body of European Regulators of Electronic Communications (BEREC)
- Regulation on roaming charges in the European Union
