= Jonas Öberg =

Swedish software programmer (born 1977)

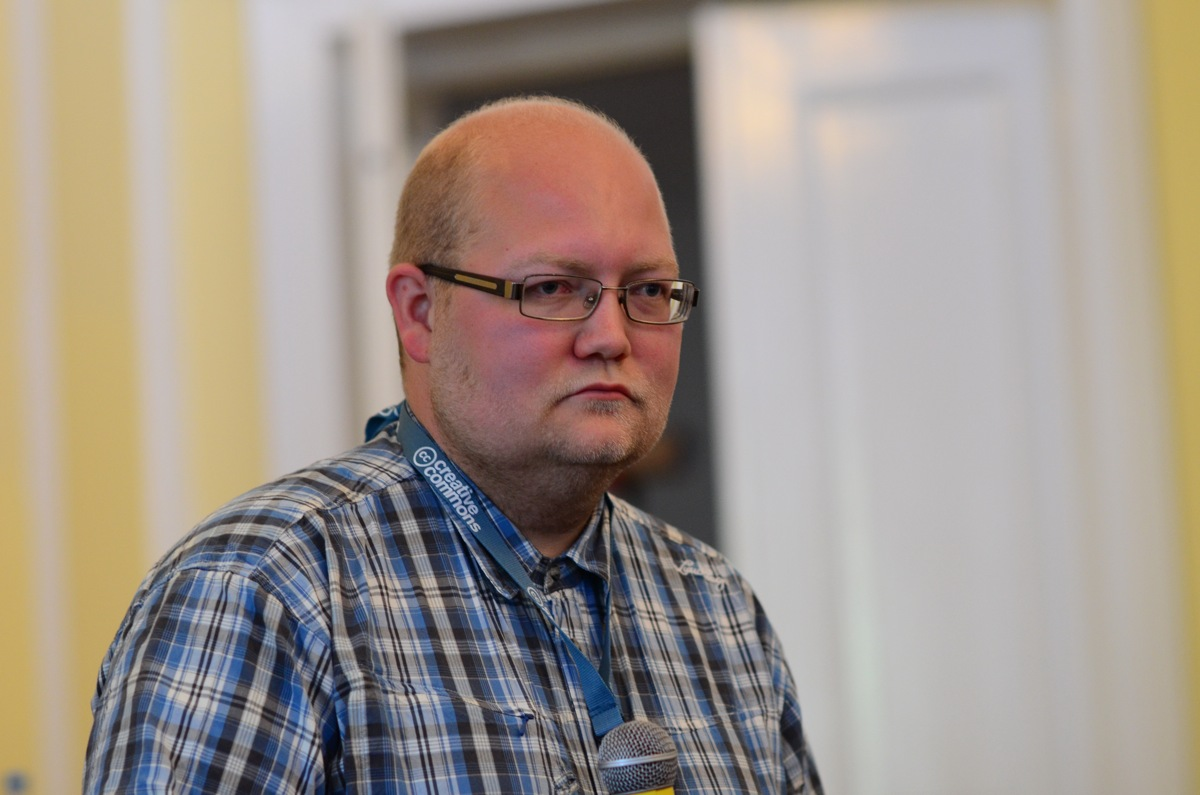
- Born: 22 November 1977 (age 48); Norrköping, Sweden
- Occupations: Fellow of the Shuttleworth Foundation Founder and vice president of the Free Software Foundation Europe (2001-2008) and Regional Coordinator for Creative Commons (2011-2013)
- Spouse: Julia Velkova (2013-present)

Jonas Öberg (born 22 November 1977 in Norrköping, Sweden) is a free and open-source software activist, describing himself as an instigator in the world of free, having worked with the Free Software Foundation Europe, GNU Project, FSCONS, Creative Commons and the Shuttleworth Foundation. He started to develop software in 1991 and installed his first Linux operating system in 1993 after which he eventually joined as a webmaster for the GNU Project. In the late 1990s, he spent some time at the MIT AI Labs where he met with Richard Stallman and others from the Free Software Foundation, joining them for The Bazaar conference in New York. Since 2002, he has been on the award committee for the Free Software Foundation's Free Software Awards.

In 2001, he was a founding member of the Free Software Foundation Europe and took up a role as vice president on 22 November 2001 when former vice president Loïc Dachary took a step back to focus on GNU Savannah.

Having worked with Creative Commons for several years, including running a course of fundraising at the Peer to Peer University, he became the first Regional Coordinator for Europe in 2011. His work for the organisation eventually led him to a position as a Fellow of the Shuttleworth Foundation where his work focus on creating tools and prototypes for the embedding of metadata for licensing and attribution requirements in digital works. His company Commons Machinery was featured as one of the 12 winners of Tech All Stars 2014, a competition of the European Commission's and Neelie Kroes's Digital Agenda.

== Personal life ==
He has a 19th-century wooden house in the North of Sweden which he is continuously renovating and lives outside of Stockholm in Gnesta, Sweden. He married Julia Velkova, a media researcher and member of Internet Society Bulgaria, at the Ice hotel in Sweden on 8 March 2013.
