= FSF Free Software Awards =

Annual awards by the Free Software Foundation

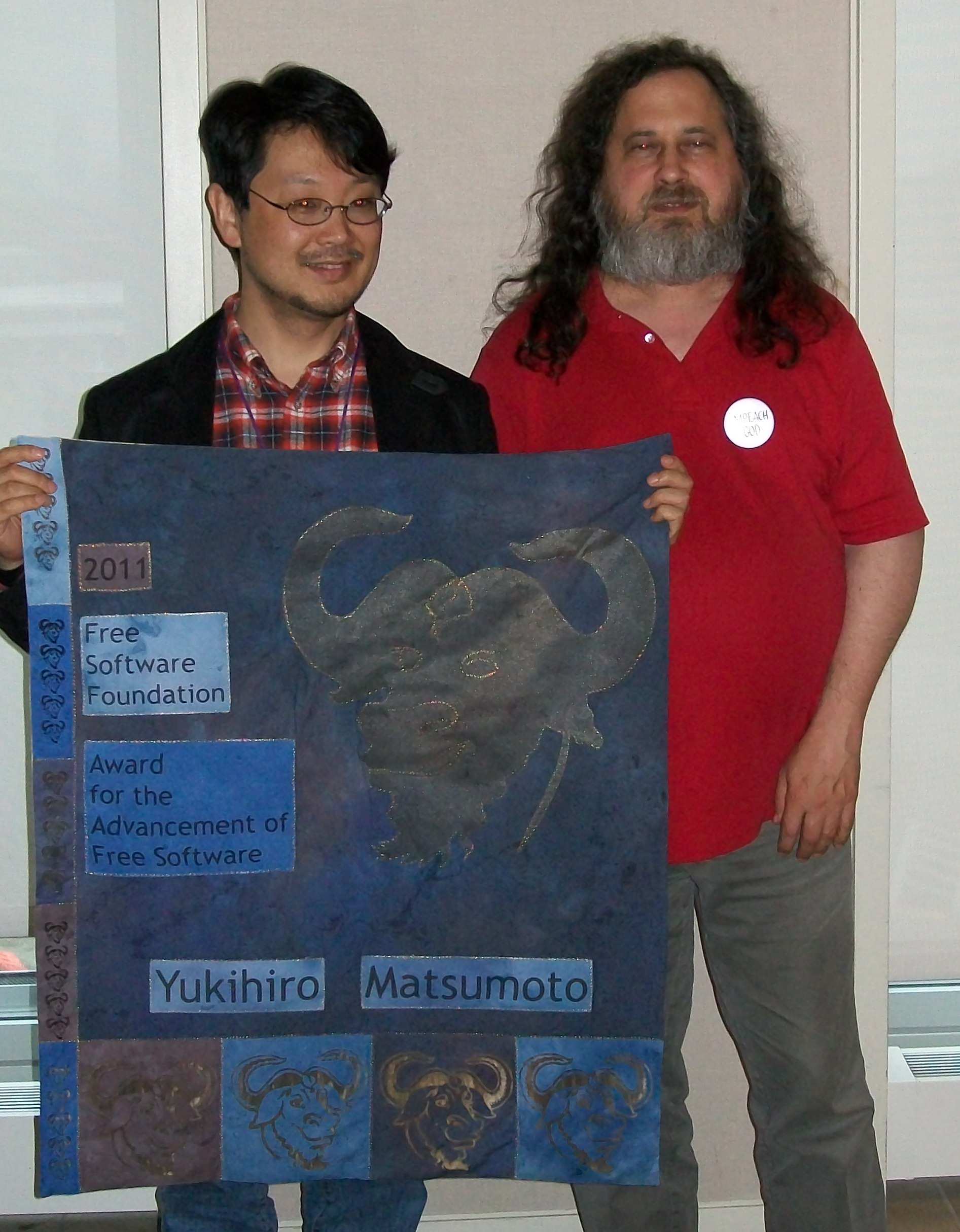
Yukihiro Matsumoto accepting the 2011 Advancement of Free Software award from former FSF president Richard Stallman

The Free Software Foundation (FSF) grants two annual awards. Since 1998, FSF has granted the award for Advancement of Free Software and since 2005, also the Free Software Award for Projects of Social Benefit.

== Presentation ceremonies ==
In 1999 the award for Advancement of Free Software was presented at the Jacob Javits Center European Meeting (FOSDEM). Since 2006, the awards have been presented at the FSF's annual members meeting in Cambridge, Massachusetts.

== Advancement of Free Software award ==
The Advancement of Free Software award is annually presented by the Free Software Foundation (FSF) to a person whom it deems to have made a great contribution to the progress and development of free software, through activities that accord with the spirit of free software.

=== Winners ===
Source: Award for the Advancement of Free Software

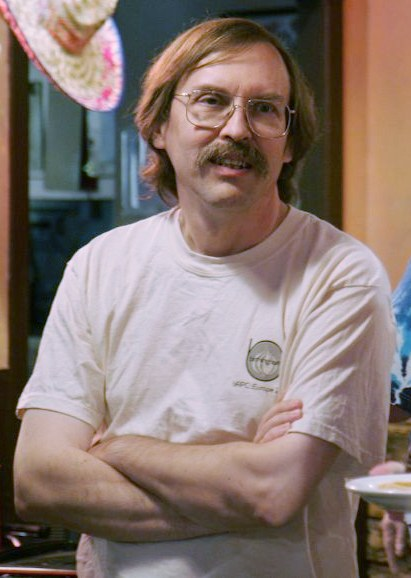
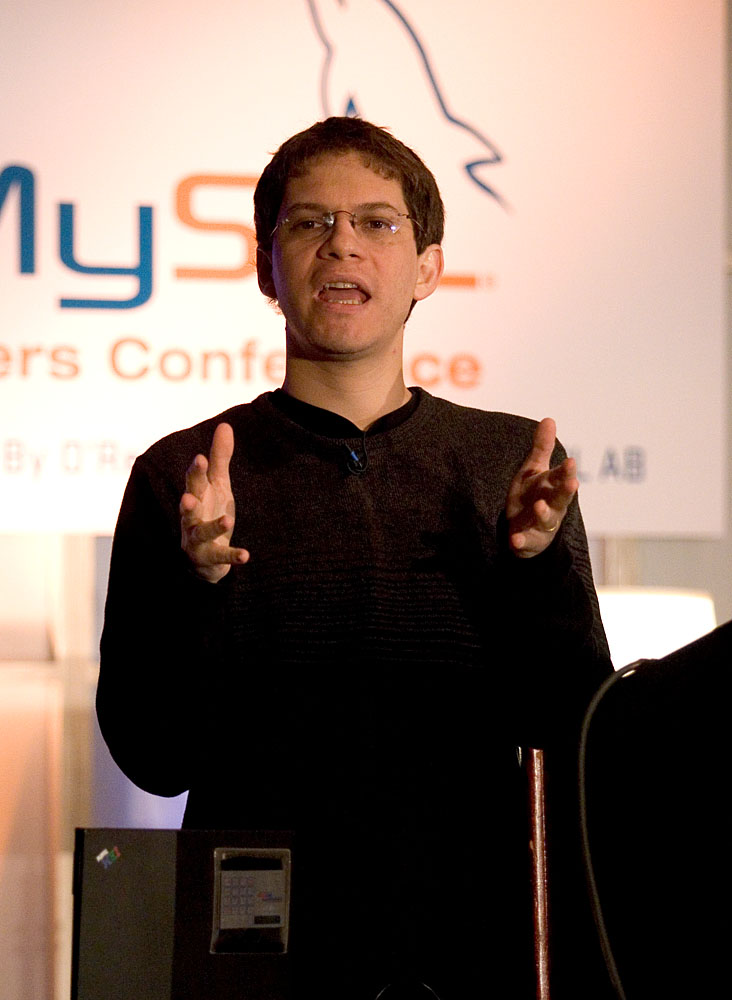
Larry Wall, 1998	Miguel de Icaza, 1999

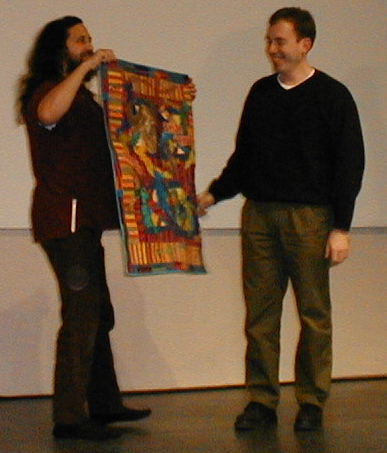
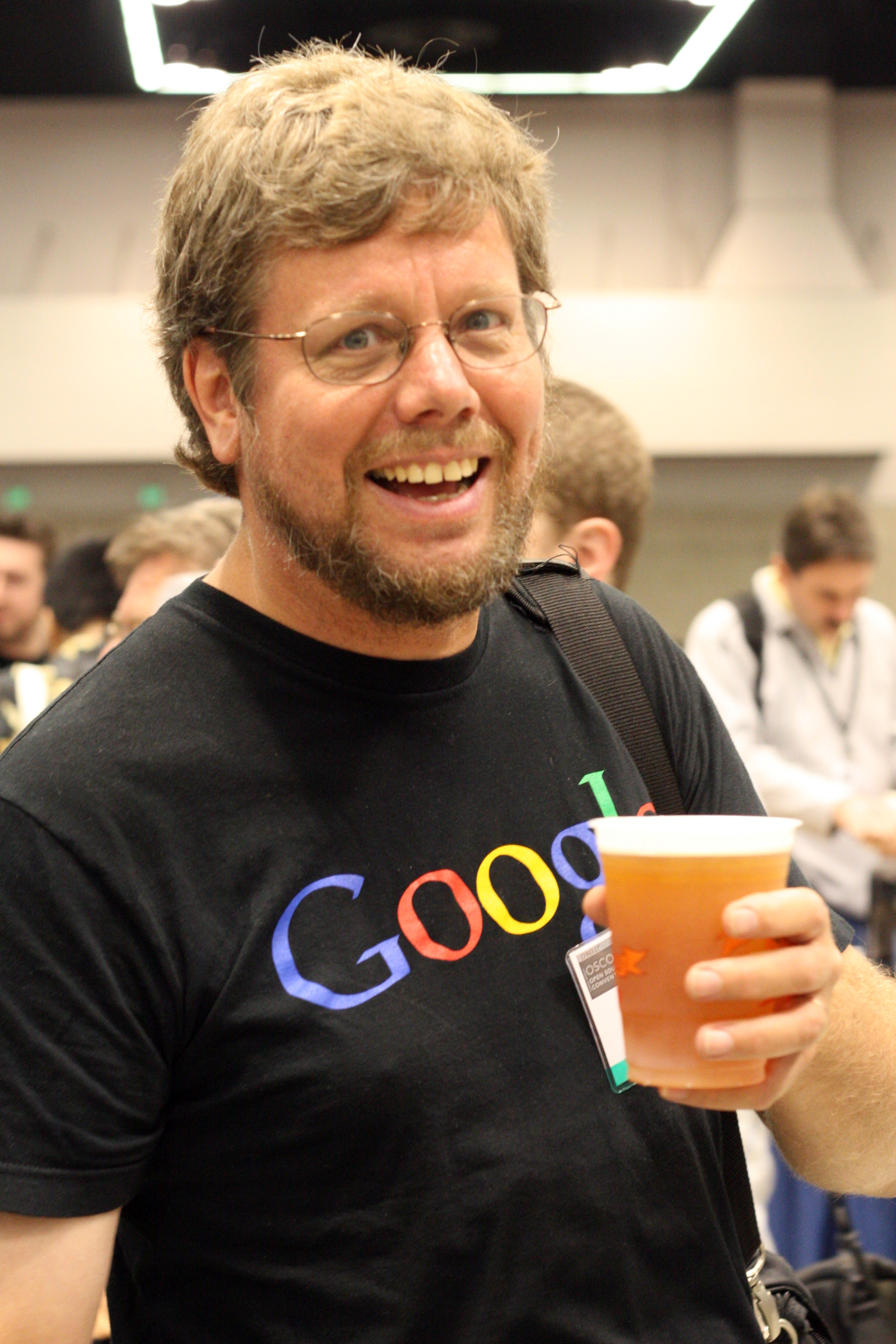
Brian Paul, 2000	Guido van Rossum, 2001

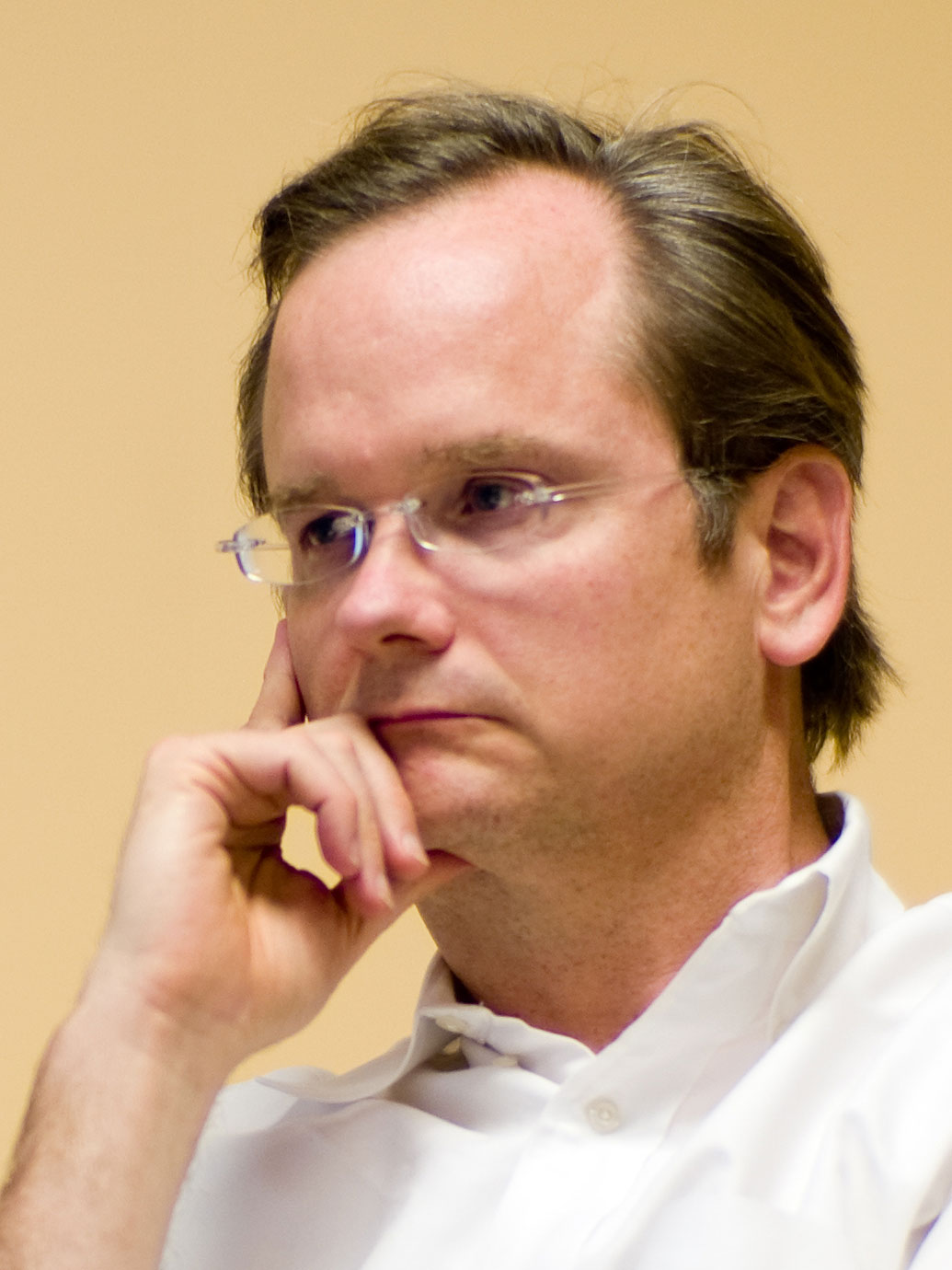
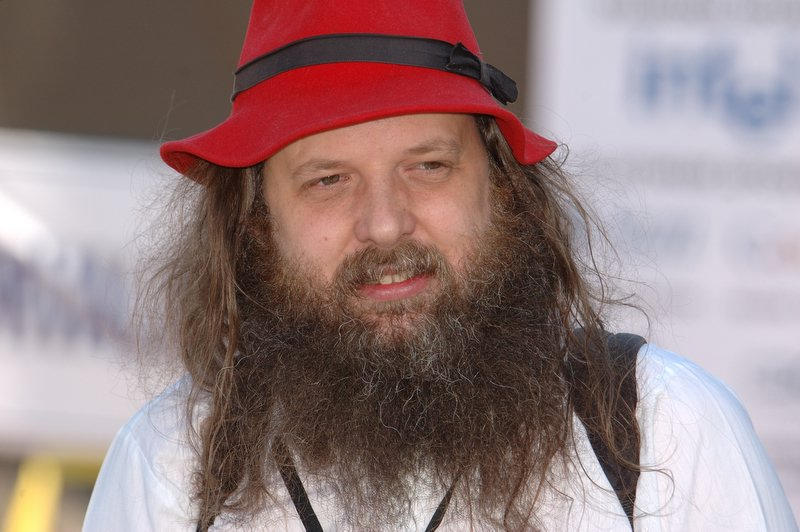
Lawrence Lessig, 2002	Alan Cox, 2003

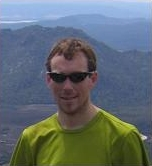
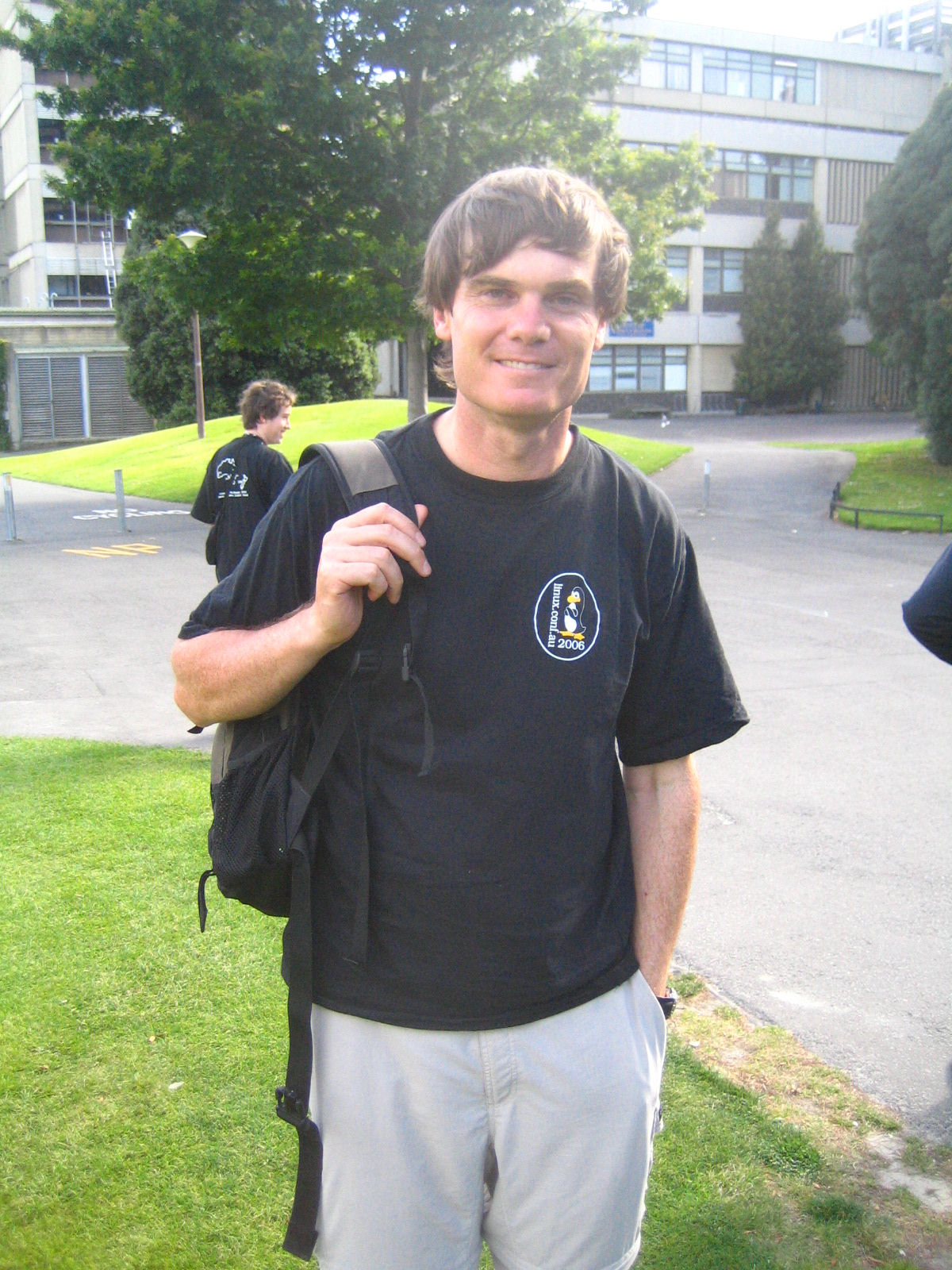
Theo de Raadt, 2004	Andrew Tridgell, 2005

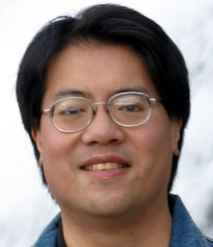
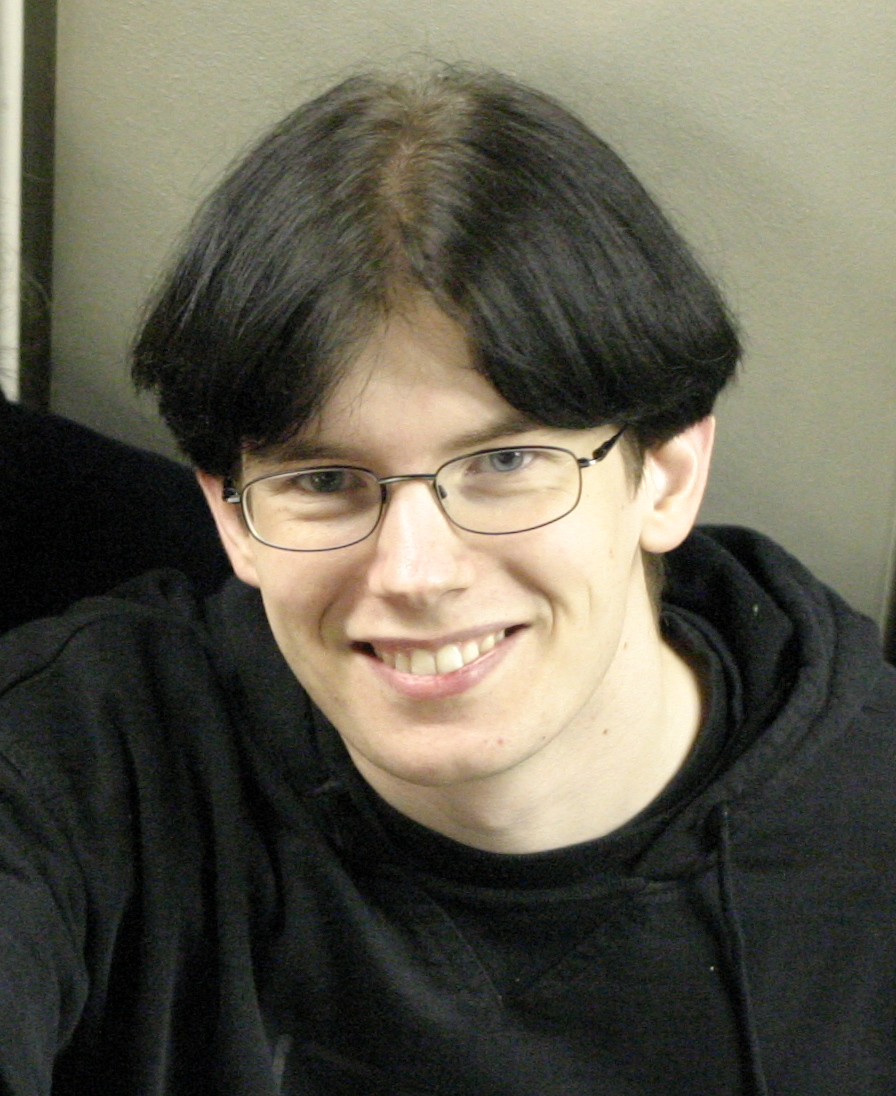
Theodore Ts'o, 2006	Harald Welte, 2007

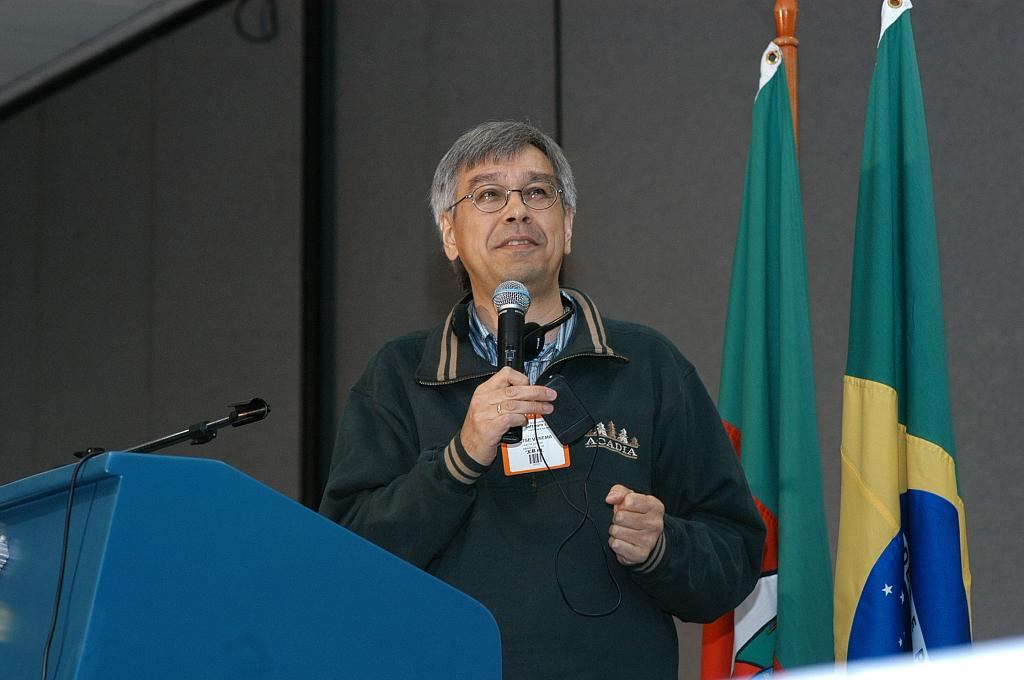
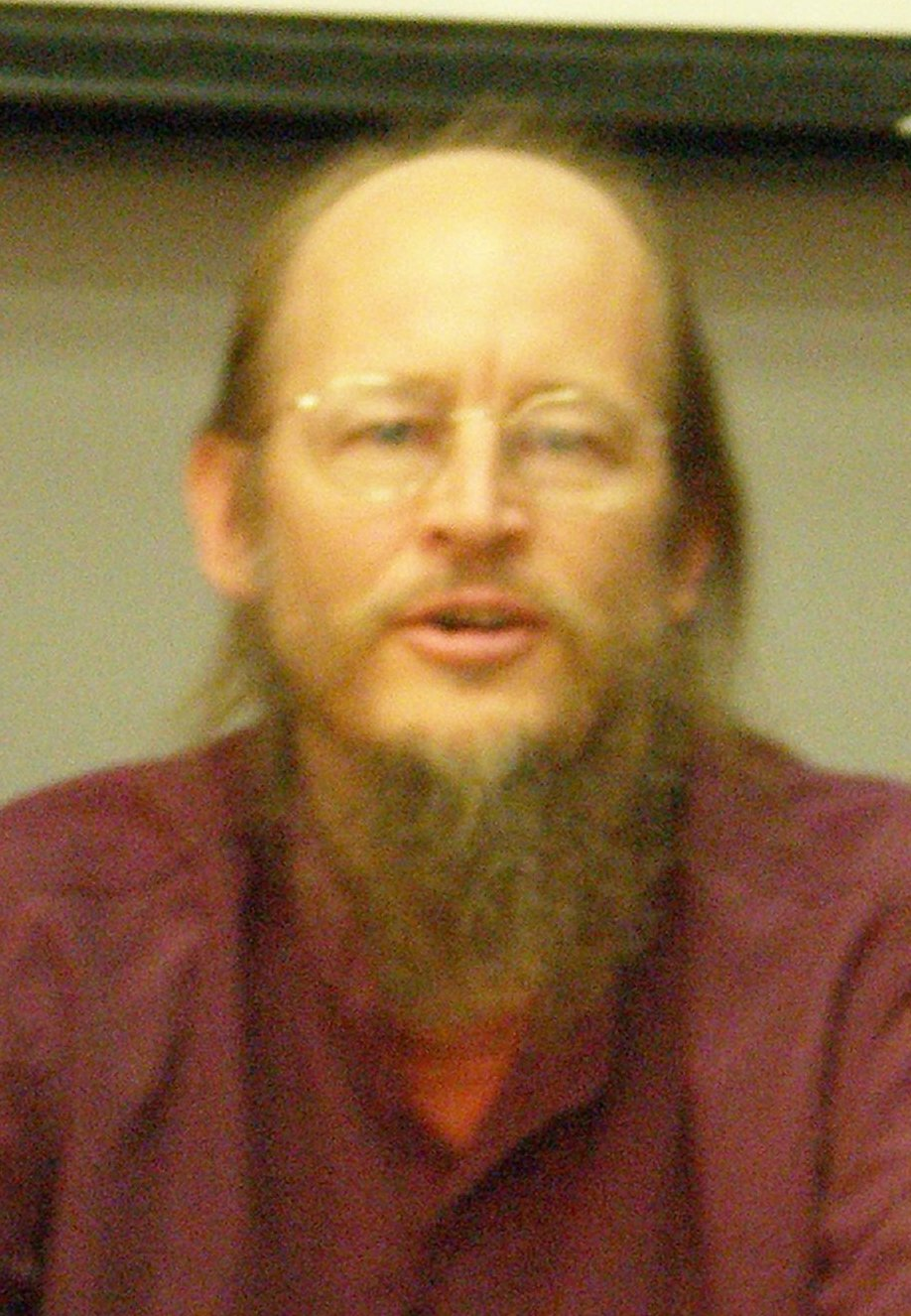
Wietse Venema, 2008	John Gilmore, 2009

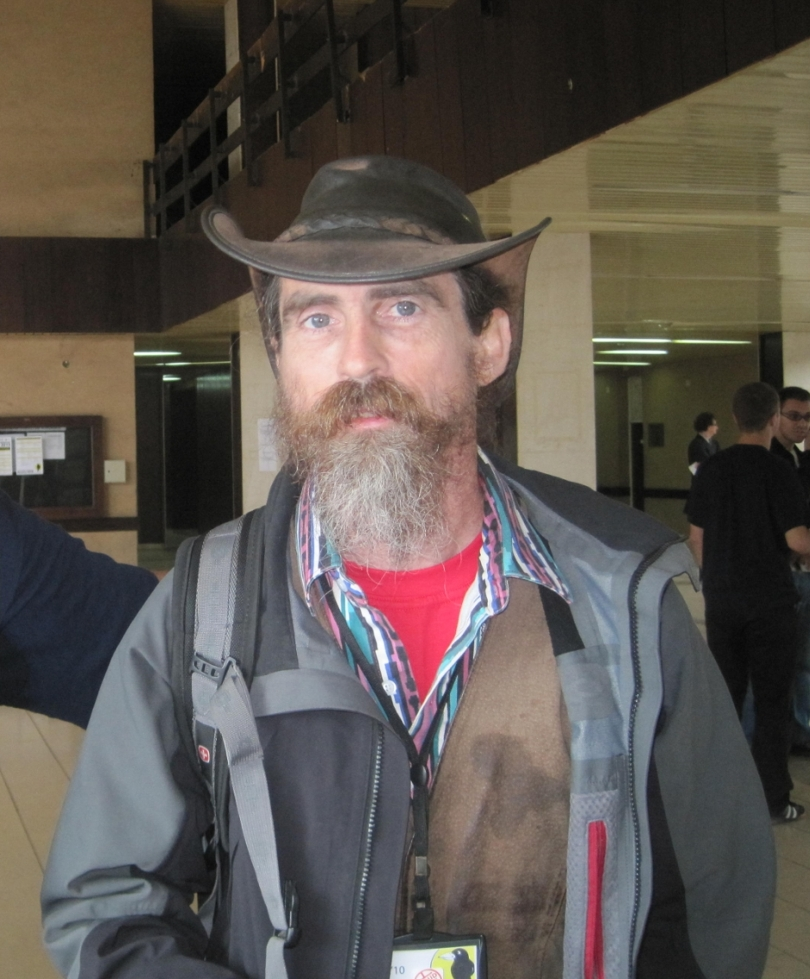
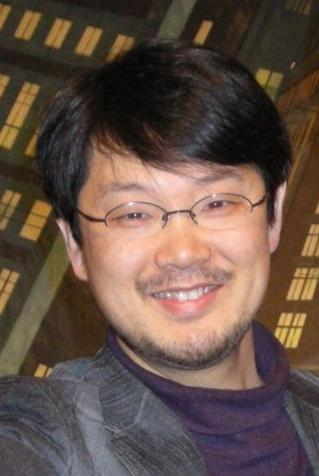
Rob Savoye, 2010	Yukihiro Matsumoto, 2011

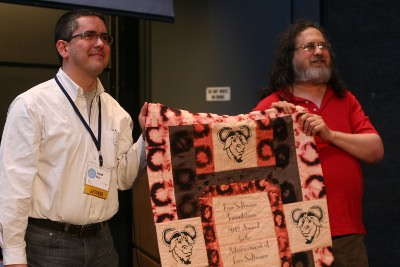
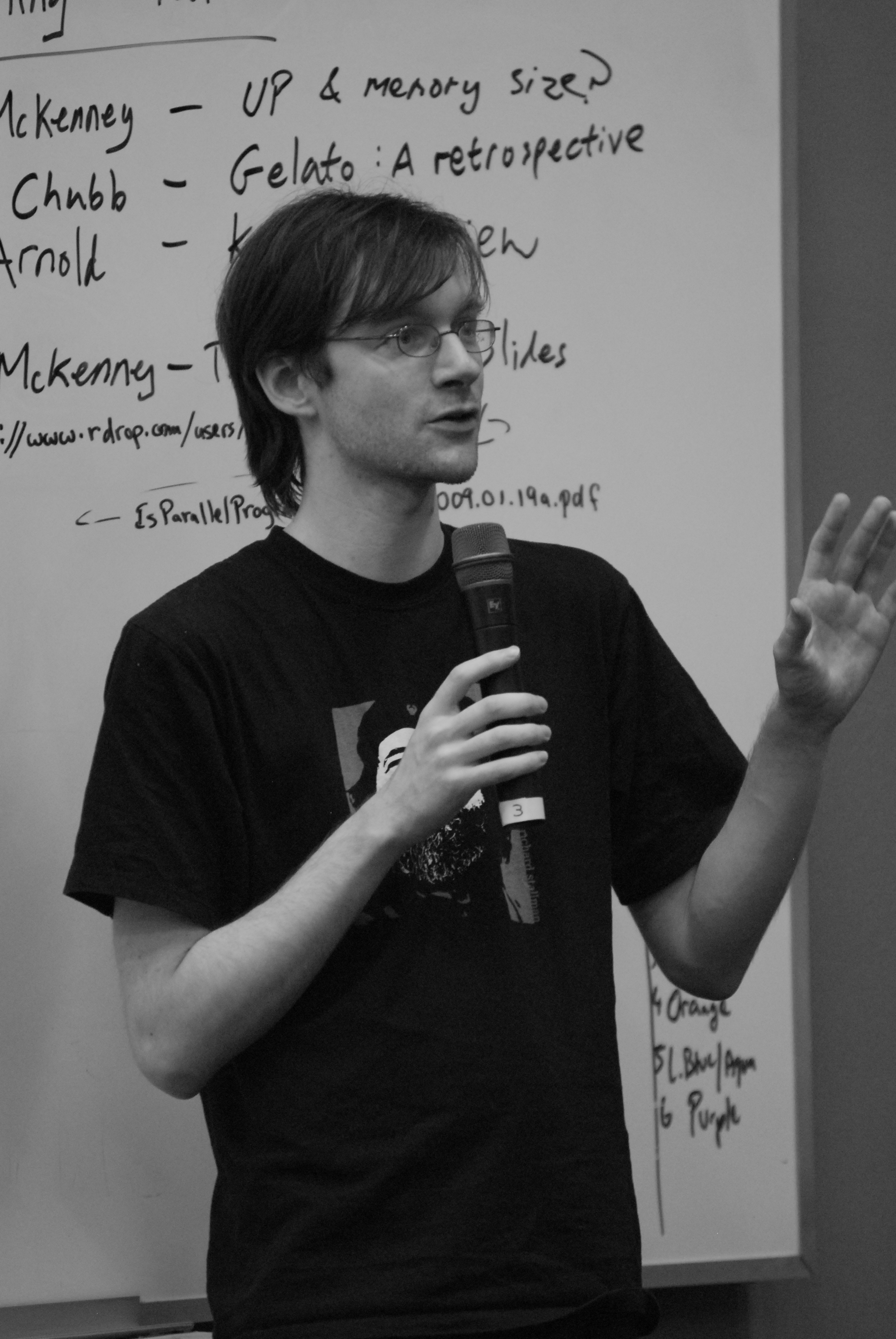
Fernando Pérez, 2012	Matthew Garrett, 2013

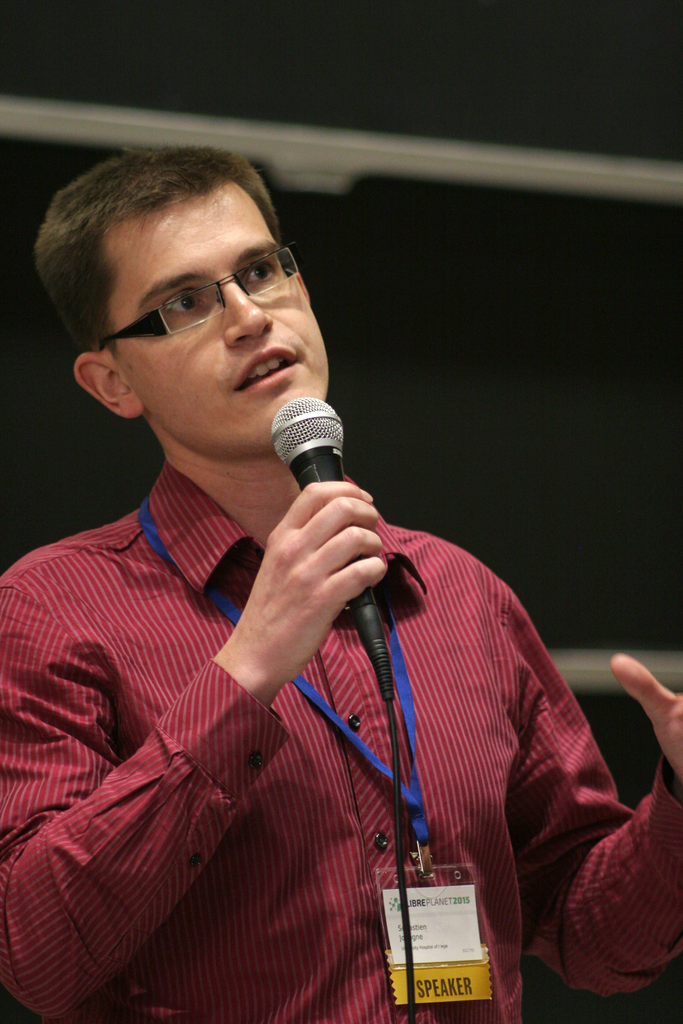
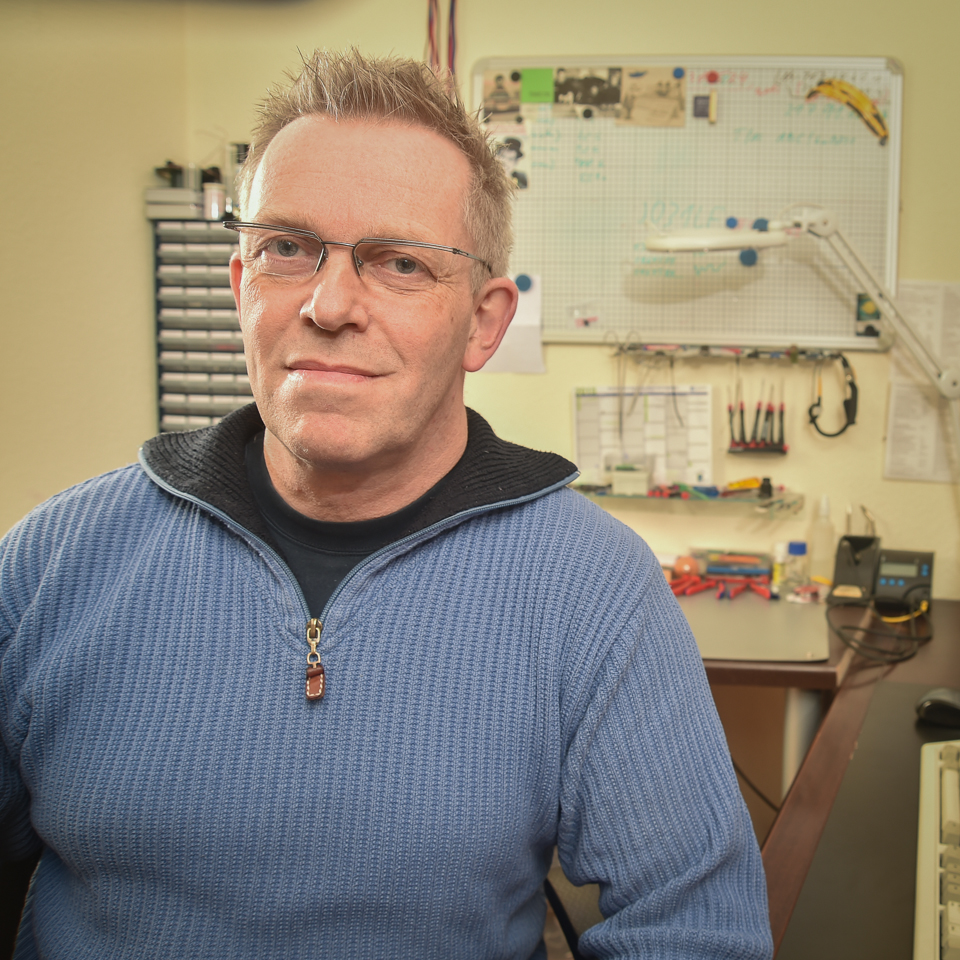
Sébastien Jodogne, 2014	Werner Koch, 2015

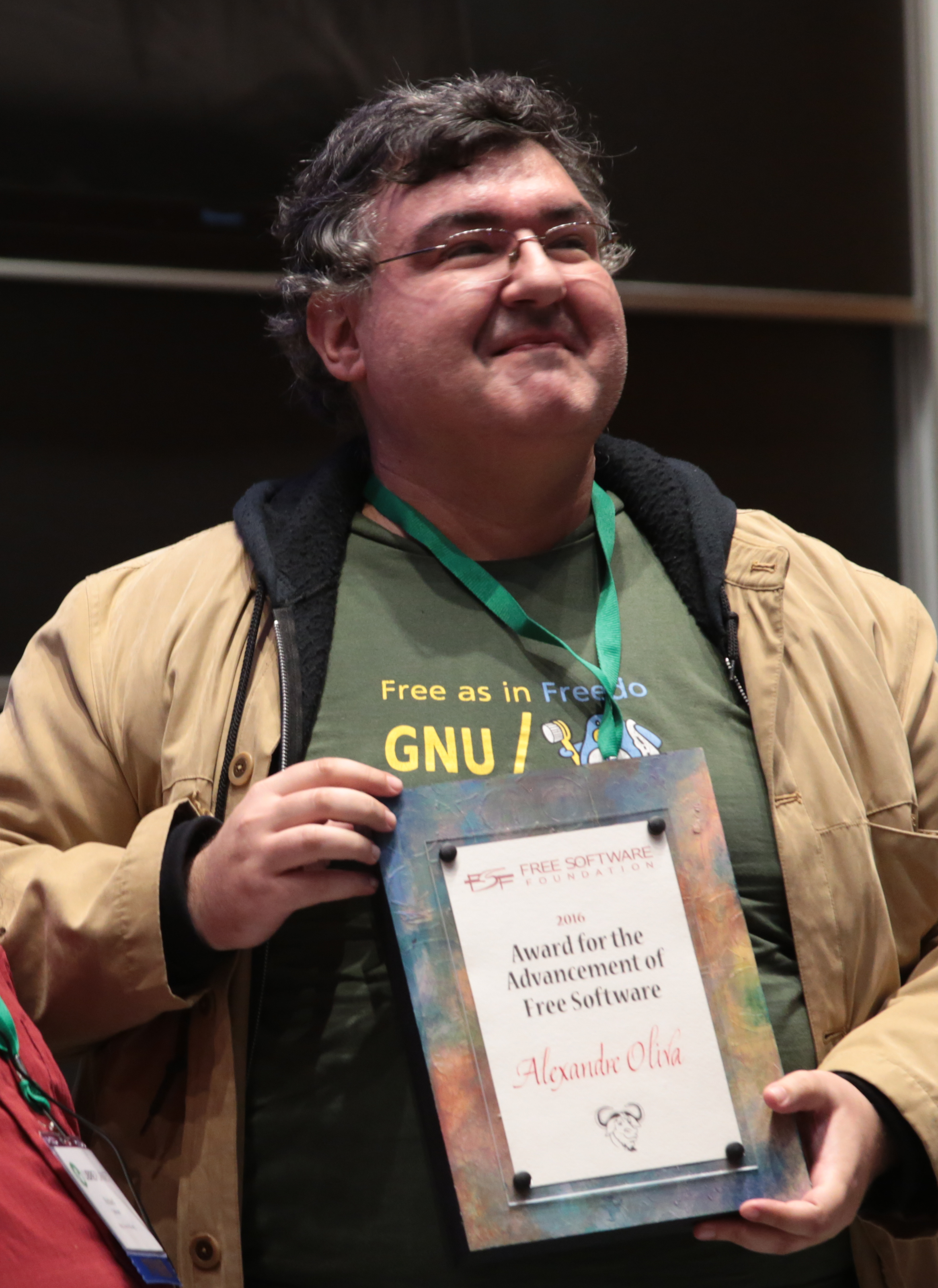
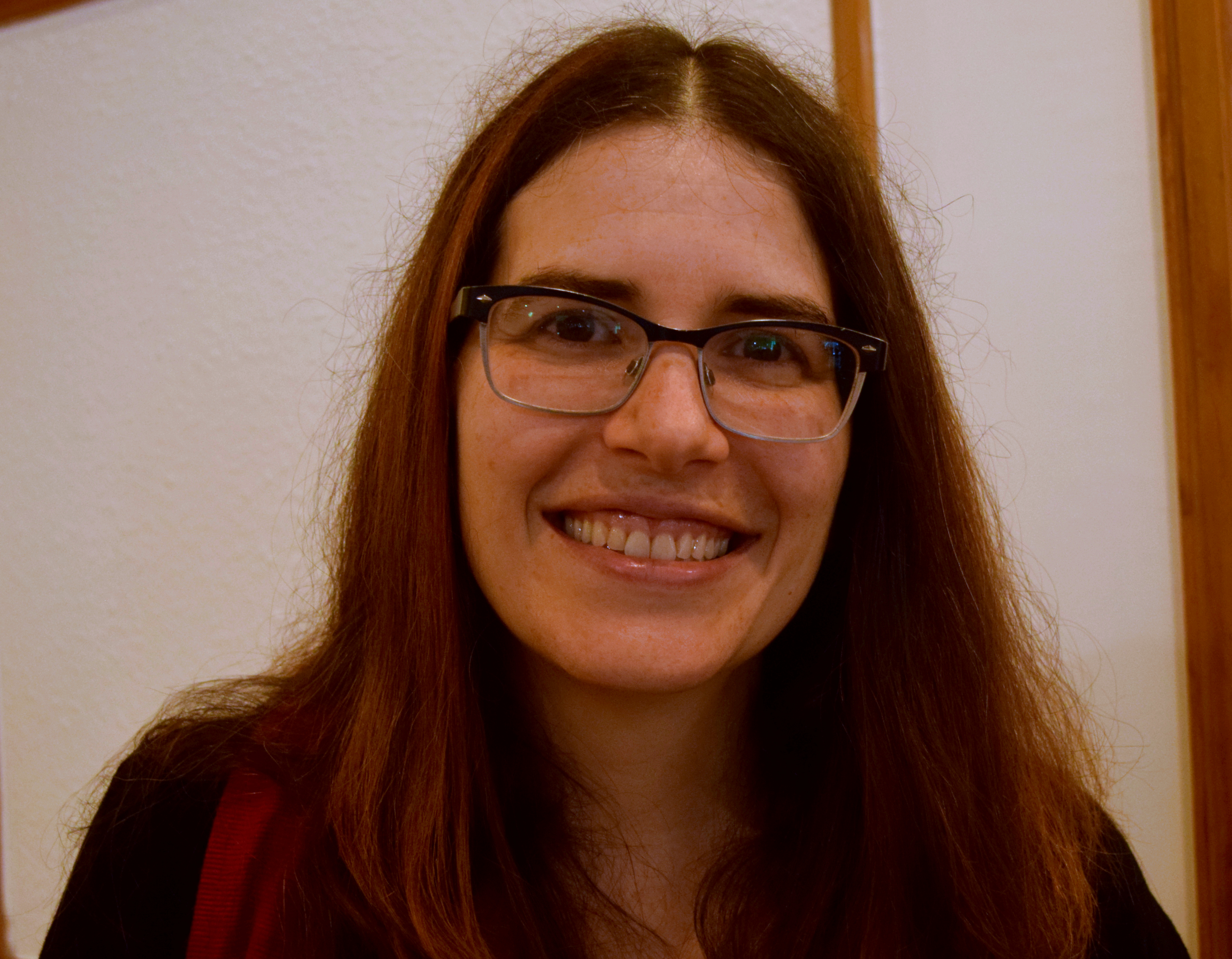
Alexandre Oliva, 2016	Karen Sandler, 2017

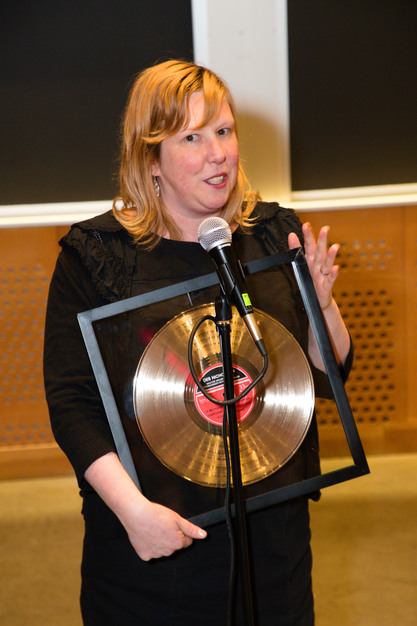
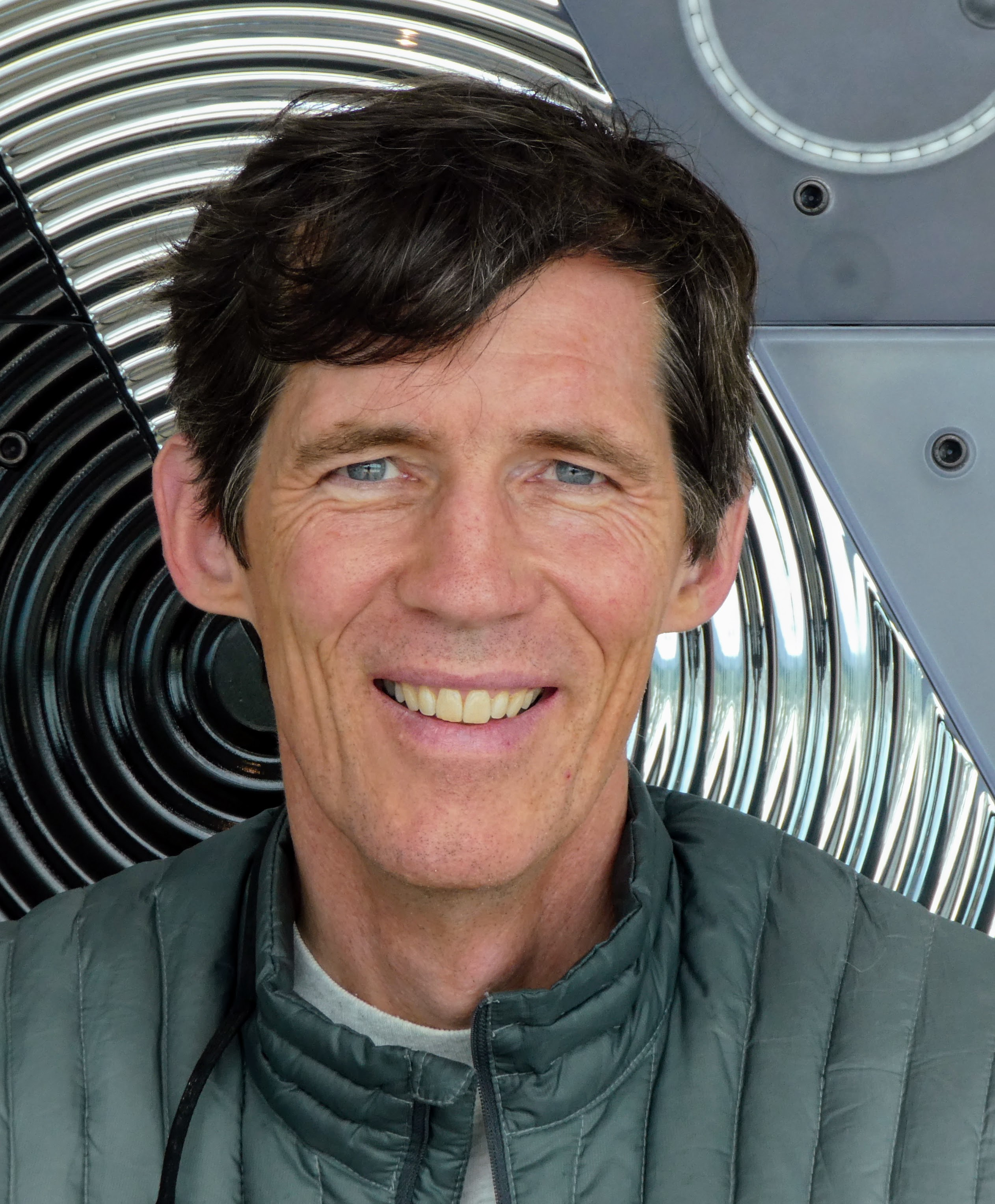
Deborah Nicholson, 2018	Jim Meyering, 2019

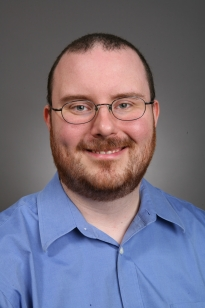
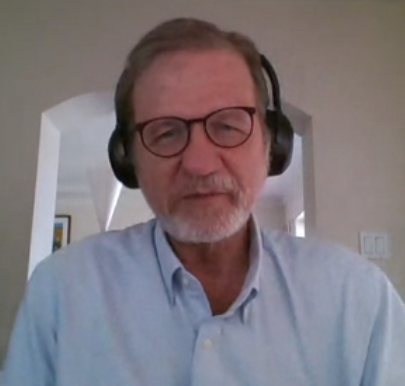
Bradley M. Kuhn, 2020	Paul Eggert, 2021

1998 Larry Wall
for numerous contributions to Free Software, notably Perl. The other finalists were the Apache Project, Tim Berners-Lee, Jordan Hubbard, Ted Lemon, Eric S. Raymond, and Henry Spencer.

1999 Miguel de Icaza
for his leadership and work on the GNOME Project. The other finalists were Donald Knuth for TeX and METAFONT and John Gilmore for work done at Cygnus Solutions and his contributions to the Free Software Foundation.

2000 Brian Paul
for his work on the Mesa 3D Graphics Library. The other finalists were Donald Becker for his work on Linux drivers and Patrick Lenz for the open source site Freshmeat.

2001 Guido van Rossum
for Python. The other finalists were L. Peter Deutsch for GNU Ghostscript and Andrew Tridgell for Samba.

2002 Lawrence Lessig
for promoting understanding of the political dimension of free software, including the idea that "code is law". The other finalists were Bruno Haible for CLISP and Theo de Raadt for OpenBSD.

2003 Alan Cox
for his work advocating the importance of software freedom, his outspoken opposition to the US's DMCA as well as other technology control measures, and his development work on the Linux kernel. The other finalists were Theo de Raadt for OpenBSD and Werner Koch for GnuPG.

2004 Theo de Raadt
for his campaigning against binary blobs, and the opening of drivers, documentation and firmware of wireless networking cards for the good of everyone. The other finalists were Andrew Tridgell for Samba and Cesar Brod for advocacy in Brazil.

2005 Andrew Tridgell
for his work on Samba and his BitKeeper client which led to the withdrawal of gratis BitKeeper licenses, spurring the development of git, a free software distributed revision control system for the Linux kernel. The other finalists were Hartmut Pilch founder of the Foundation for a Free Information Infrastructure for his combatting of the Software Patent Directive in Europe and Theodore Ts'o for his Linux kernel filesystem development.

2006 Theodore Ts'o
for his work on the Linux kernel and his roles as a project leader in the development of Kerberos and ONC RPC. The other finalists were Wietse Venema for his creation of the Postfix mailserver and his work on security tools, and Yukihiro Matsumoto for his work in designing the Ruby programming language.

2007 Harald Welte
for his work on GPL enforcement (Gpl-violations.org) and Openmoko

2008 Wietse Venema
For his "significant and wide-ranging technical contributions to network security, and his creation of the Postfix email server."

2009 John Gilmore
For his "many contributions and long term commitment to the free software movement."

2010 Rob Savoye
For his work on Gnash

Additionally, a special mention was made to honor the memory and contribution of Adrian Hands, who used a morse input device to code and successfully submit a GNOME patch, three days before he died from ALS.

2011 Yukihiro Matsumoto
the creator of Ruby, for his work on GNU, Ruby, and other Free Software for over 20 years.

2012 Fernando Pérez
for his work on IPython, and his role in the scientific Python community.

2013 Matthew Garrett
for his work to support software freedom in relation to Secure Boot, UEFI, and the Linux kernel

2014 Sébastien Jodogne
for his work on easing the exchange of medical images and developing Orthanc.

2015 Werner Koch
the founder and driving force behind GnuPG. GnuPG is the de facto tool for encrypted communication. Society needs more than ever to advance free encryption technology.

2016 Alexandre Oliva
for his work in promoting Free Software and the involvement in projects like the maintenance of linux-libre and the reverse engineer of the proprietary software used by Brazilian citizens to submit their taxes to the government.

2017 Karen Sandler
for her dedication to Free Software as the former Executive Director of GNOME Foundation, current Executive Director of Software Freedom Conservancy, co-organizer of Outreachy, and through years of pro bono legal advice.

2018 Deborah Nicholson
Deborah was the director of community operations at the Software Freedom Conservancy, Stallman praised her body of work and her unremitting and widespread contributions to the free software community. "Deborah continuously reaches out to, and engages, new audiences with her message on the need for free software in any version of the future. "

2019 Jim Meyering
a prolific free software programmer, maintainer and writer, having contributed significantly to the GNU Core Utilities, GNU Autotools and Gnulib.

2020 Bradley M. Kuhn
for his work in enforcing the GNU General Public License (GPL) and promoting copyleft through his position at Software Freedom Conservancy.

2021 Paul Eggert
a computer scientist who teaches in the Department of Computer Science at the University of California, Los Angeles, contributor to the GNU operating system for over thirty years and current maintainer of the Time Zone Database.

2022 Eli Zaretskii
Contributor and co-maintainer of GNU Emacs, for over thirty years and overseeing more than two hundred active contributors.

2023 Bruno Haible
One of the lead contributors and a maintainer of Gnulib.

2024 Andy Wingo
One of the co-maintainers of GNU Guile.

== Social benefit award ==
Source: The Award for Projects of Social Benefit

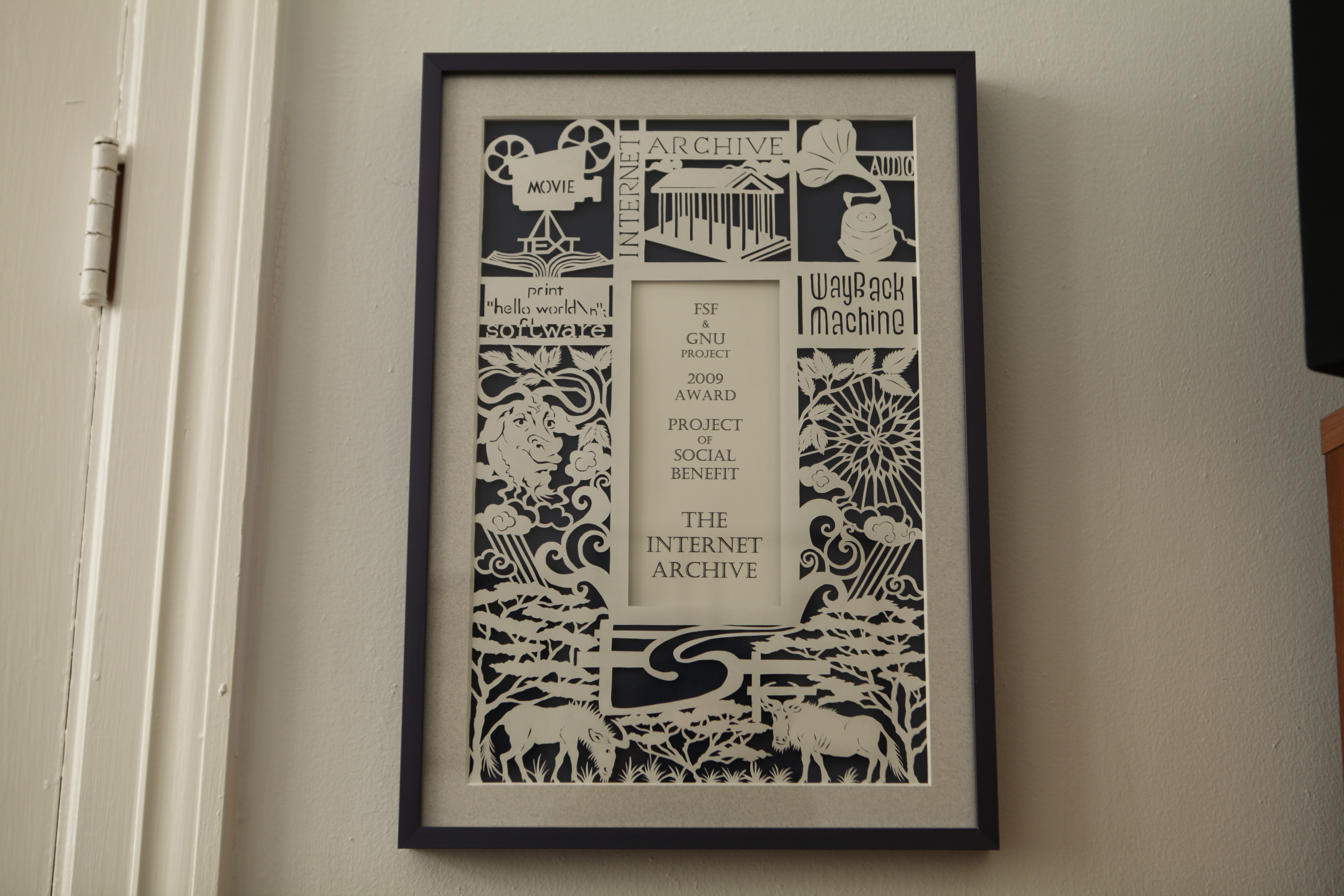
2009 Award for Projects of Social Benefit awarded to The Internet Archive.

The Free Software Award for Projects of Social Benefit is an annual award granted by the Free Software Foundation (FSF). In announcing the award, the FSF explained that:

This award is presented to the project or team responsible for applying free software, or the ideas of the free software movement, in a project that intentionally and significantly benefits society in other aspects of life.

According to Richard Stallman, former President of FSF, the award was inspired by the Sahana project which was developed, and was used, for organising the transfer of aid to tsunami victims in Sri Lanka after the 2004 Indian Ocean earthquake. The developers indicated that they hope to adapt it to aid in other future disasters.

This is the second annual award created by the FSF. The first was the Award for the Advancement of Free Software (AAFS).

=== Winners ===
The award was first awarded in 2005, and the recipients have been:

2005 Wikipedia
The Free Encyclopedia
2006 The Sahana FOSS Disaster Management System
"An entirely volunteer effort to create technology for managing large-scale relief efforts."
2007 Groklaw
"An invaluable source of legal and technical information for software developers, lawyers, law professors, and historians."
2008 Creative Commons
"[For] foster[ing] a growing body of creative, educational and scientific works that can be shared and built upon by others [and] work[ing] to raise awareness of the harm inflicted by increasingly restrictive copyright regimes."
2009 Internet Archive
For collecting freely available information, archiving the web, collaborating with libraries, and creating free software to make information available to the public.
2010 Tor
For writing software to help privacy online.
2011 GNU Health
For their work with health professionals around the world to improve the lives of the underprivileged.
2012 OpenMRS
"A free software medical record system for developing countries. OpenMRS is now in use around the world, including South Africa, Kenya, Rwanda, Lesotho, Zimbabwe, Mozambique, Uganda, Tanzania, Haiti, India, China, United States, Pakistan, the Philippines, and many other places."
2013 GNOME Foundation's Outreach Program for Women
OPW's work benefits society, "addressing gender discrimination by empowering women to develop leadership and development skills in a society which runs on technology."
2014 Reglue
which donates refurbished Linux computers to underprivileged children in Austin, TX.
2015 Library Freedom Project
A partnership among librarians, technologists, attorneys, and privacy advocates which aims to make real the promise of intellectual freedom in libraries. By teaching librarians about surveillance threats, privacy rights and responsibilities, and digital tools to stop surveillance, the project hopes to create a privacy-centric paradigm shift in libraries and the local communities they serve.
2016 SecureDrop
An open-source software platform for secure communication between journalists and sources (whistleblowers).
2017 Public Lab
A non-profit organization that facilitates collaborative, open source environmental research in a model known as Community Science.
2018 OpenStreetMap
A collaborative project to create a free editable map of the world. Founded by Steve Coast in the UK in 2004, OpenStreetMap is built by a community of over one million community members and has found its application on thousands of Web sites, mobile apps, and hardware devices. OpenStreetMap is the only truly global service without restrictions on use or availability of map information.
2019 Let's Encrypt
A Certificate Authority (CA) that provides an easy way to obtain and install free TLS/SSL certificates.
2020 CiviCRM
Free program that nonprofit organizations around the world use to manage their mailings and contact databases.
2021 SecuRepairs
An association of information security experts who support the right to repair.
2022 GNU Jami
Free software tool for distributed, secure, encrypted videoconferencing.
2023 code.gouv.fr
French Free Software Unit of the French government.
2024 Govdirectory
Collaborative and fact-checked listing of government addresses, phone numbers, websites, and social media accounts, all of which can be viewed with free software and under a free license, allowing people to always reach their representatives in freedom.

== Award for outstanding new Free Software contributor ==
The third annual award created by the FSF, the award is presented to an exceptional newcomer to the free software community.

=== Winners ===
The award was first awarded for 2019 at LibrePlanet 2020, and the recipients have been:

2019 Clarissa Lima Borges
Outreachy internship work focused on usability testing for various GNOME applications.
2020 Alyssa Rosenzweig
Leads the Panfrost project, a project to reverse engineer and implement a free driver for the Mali series of graphics processing units (GPUs) used on a wide variety of single-board computers and mobile phones.
2021 Protesilaos Stavrou
A philosopher who since 2019 has become a mainstay of the GNU Emacs community through his blog posts, conference talks, livestreams, and code contributions.
2022 Tad (SkewedZepplin)
Lead developer of DivestOS, which aims to remove proprietary binaries, and supports free software, security, privacy, and extending usefulness of older devices. Also a contributor to Replicant.
2023 Nick Logozzo
lead developer of Parabolic (not to be confused with Parabola GNU/Linux)
2024 Alx Sa
Contributor for GIMP

== Award Committee ==
- 1998: Peter H. Salus, Scott Christley, Rich Morin, Adam Richter, Richard Stallman, and Vernor Vinge
- 1999: Peter H. Salus, no further details found
- 2000: no details found
- 2001 The selection committee included: Miguel de Icaza, Ian Murdock, Eric S. Raymond, Peter H. Salus, Vernor Vinge, and Larry Wall
- 2002 The selection committee included: Enrique A. Chaparro, Frederic Couchet, Hong Feng, Miguel de Icaza, Raj Mathur, Frederick Noronha, Jonas Öberg, Eric S. Raymond, Guido van Rossum, Peter H. Salus, Suresh Ramasubramanian, and Larry Wall
- 2003 The selection committee included: Enrique A. Chaparro, Frederic Couchet, Miguel de Icaza, Raj Mathur, Frederick Noronha, Jonas Öberg, Bruce Perens, Peter H. Salus, Suresh Ramasubramanian, Richard Stallman, and Vernor Vinge
- 2004: Suresh Ramasubramanian, Raj Mathur, Frederick Noronha, Hong Feng, Frederic Couchet, Enrique A. Chaparro, Vernor Vinge, Larry Wall, Alan Cox, Peter H Salus, Richard Stallman
- 2005: Peter H. Salus (chair), Richard Stallman, Alan Cox, Lawrence Lessig, Guido van Rossum, Frederic Couchet, Jonas Öberg, Hong Feng, Bruce Perens, Raj Mathur, Suresh Ramasubramanian, Enrique A. Chaparro, Ian Murdock
- 2006: Peter H. Salus (chair), Richard Stallman, Andrew Tridgell, Alan Cox, Lawrence Lessig, Vernor Vinge, Frederic Couchet, Jonas Öberg, Hong Feng, Raj Mathur, Suresh Ramasubramanian
- 2008: Suresh Ramasubramanian (Chair), Peter H. Salus, Raj Mathur, Hong Feng, Andrew Tridgell, Jonas Öberg, Vernor Vinge, Richard Stallman, and Fernanda G. Weiden.
- 2009: Suresh Ramasubramanian (Chair), Peter H. Salus, Lawrence Lessig, Raj Mathur, Wietse Venema, Hong Feng, Andrew Tridgell, Jonas Öberg, Vernor Vinge, Richard Stallman, Fernanda G. Weiden and Harald Welte.
- 2010: Suresh Ramasubramanian (Chair), Peter H. Salus, Raj Mathur, Wietse Venema, Hong Feng, Andrew Tridgell, Jonas Öberg, Vernor Vinge, Richard Stallman, Fernanda G. Weiden and Harald Welte.
- 2011: Suresh Ramasubramanian (Chair), Peter H. Salus, Raj Mathur, Wietse Venema, Hong Feng, Andrew Tridgell, Jonas Öberg, Vernor Vinge, Richard Stallman, Fernanda G. Weiden and Harald Welte.
- 2012: Suresh Ramasubramanian (Chair), Peter H. Salus, Raj Mathur, Wietse Venema, Hong Feng, Andrew Tridgell, Jonas Öberg, Vernor Vinge, Richard Stallman, Fernanda G. Weiden and Harald Welte.
- 2013: Suresh Ramasubramanian (Chair), Wietse Venema, Hong Feng, Andrew Tridgell, Jonas Öberg, Vernor Vinge, Richard Stallman, Fernanda G. Weiden, Rob Savoye and Harald Welte.
- 2014: Suresh Ramasubramanian (Chair), Marina Zhurakhinskaya, Matthew Garrett, Rob Savoye, Wietse Venema, Richard Stallman, Vernor Vinge, Hong Feng, Fernanda G. Weiden, Harald Welte, Jonas Öberg, and Yukihiro Matsumoto.

== See also ==
- List of computer-related awards
