= ECIS =

ECIS may refer to:

- European Committee for Interoperable Systems
- European Conference on Information Systems
- European Council of International Schools
- Electric cell-substrate impedance sensing
- Eindhoven Centre for Innovation Studies, a research centre based at the School of Innovation Sciences at Eindhoven University of Technology
- Evaluación de la Calidad en Interpretación Simultánea, a research group on simultaneous interpreting, based at the University of Granada
