= Gpl-violations.org =

Website tracking violations of the GNU General Public License

gpl-violations.org
- Website type: Copyright violation information site
- Available in: English
- Creator: Harald Welte
- Website: gpl-violations.org
- Commercial: no
- Launched: 2004

gpl-violations.org is a not-for-profit project founded and led by Harald Welte in 2004. It works to make sure software licensed under the GNU General Public License (GPL) is not used in ways prohibited by the license.

== Goals ==
The goals of the project are, according to its website, to:

- Raise public awareness of the infringing use of free software, and thus putting pressure on the infringers,
- Give users who detect or assume GPL-licensed software is being misused a way to report them to the copyright holders,
- Assist copyright holders in any action against GPL infringing organizations, and to
- Distribute information on how a commercial entity using GPL licensed software in their products can comply with the license.

In May 2008, gpl-violations.org and the Free Software Foundation Europe Freedom Task Force announced that they were to deepen their previous cooperation. The task force would focus on educating and informing, while gpl-violations.org would focus on enforcing the GPL.

== History ==
The gpl-violations.org project was founded in 2004 by Harald Welte. Welte was a kernel developer who had been actively enforcing the GPL license on his netfilter/iptables code since late 2003. Since then, other developers have given gpl-violations.org legal right to represent them. While the Software Freedom Conservancy's GPL Compliance Project for Linux Developers, operates from the United States, gpl-violations.org operates from Germany, Welte's home country.

The project has been credited with being the first to prove in court that the GPL is valid and that it will stand up in court.

Project creator Harald Welte received the 2007 FSF Award for the Advancement of Free Software, partly because of his work on gpl-violations.org.

From January till October, 2015, the website was offline and no longer resolved. It planned to continue its activities in 2016. Its activities resumed by November 2015.

== Notable victories ==
=== Fortinet ===
In 2005, the gpl-violations.org project uncovered evidence that Fortinet had used GPL code in its products against the terms of the license, and used cryptographic tools to conceal the violation. The violation was alleged to have occurred in the FortiOS system, which the gpl-violations.org project said contained elements of the Linux kernel. In response, a Munich court granted a temporary injunction against the company, preventing it from selling products until they were in compliance with the necessary license terms; Fortinet was forced to make their FortiOS available free in compliance with GPL licensing.

=== D-Link ===
On September 6, 2006, the gpl-violations.org project prevailed in court litigation against D-Link Germany GmbH regarding D-Link's alleged inappropriate and copyright infringing use of parts of the Linux kernel. The judgement provided the on-record, legal precedent that the GPL is valid and that it will stand up in German courts.

== See also ==
- Commercial use of free software
