= Associazione per il Software Libero =

The Associazione per il Software Libero (AsSoLi) is an Italian non-profit association with the primary goal of spreading free software in Italy.

Between 2001 and 2006 AsSoLi was the official Italian associate of the Free Software Foundation Europe.
