= FSCONS =

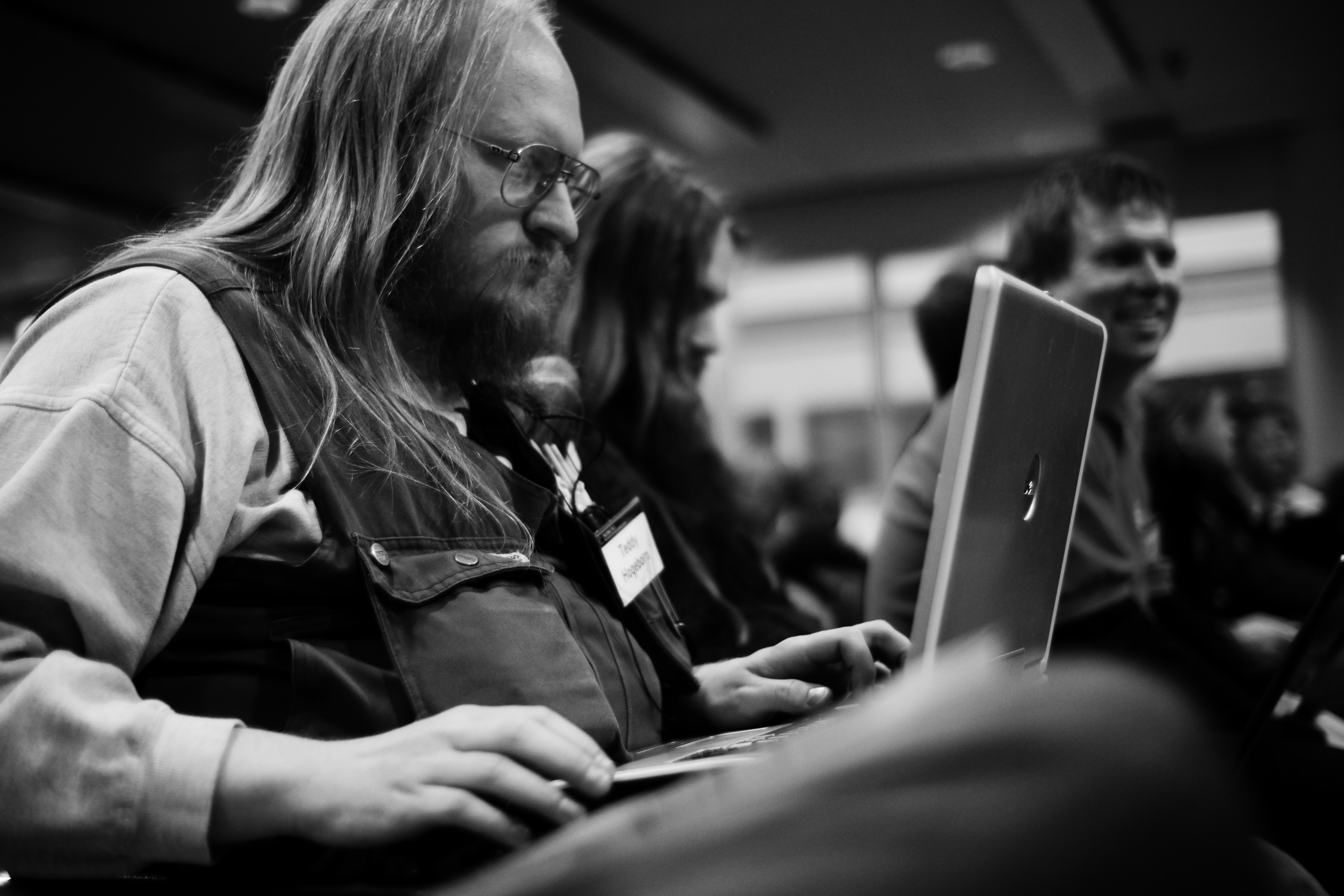
Hackers at FSCONS 2011

Free Society Conference and Nordic Summit (FSCONS) is a Nordic conference trying to bridge the gap between software and cultural freedom, held each autumn in the Nordic countries, and initially based in Gothenburg, Sweden. It shares many similarities with FOSDEM (Free and Open source Software Developers' European Meeting) in the way in which the event is structured, but where the latter attracts speakers and visitors primarily interested in Free software, FSCONS aims to attract a more diverse crowd. The conference was organised 2007-2011 by FFKP, the Society for Free Culture and Software. In 2012, a new member run association was formed to take over the organisation of conference.

== Conference history ==
The event was first organised by members of the Free Software Foundation Europe, in particular its Swedish team and the then current intern in their Gothenburg office. It was organised the 7–8 December 2007 and attracted about 80 visitors. Some of the speakers were Jonas Öberg, Mats Östling, Lars Aronsson and Georg C. F. Greve.

Through the years 2008-2011, the conference was organised once a year, always in October or November. In 2008, the FSFE was joined by Wikimedia Sverige and Creative Commons Sweden as co-organisers of the event.

Notable speakers over the years include Richard Stallman, Smári McCarthy, Oscar Swartz, Dr. Ansgar Bernardi, Christina Haralanova, Amelia Andersdotter, Marcin Jakubowski, Erik Zachte, Edmund Harriss, Karin Kosina, Henri Bergius, Glyn Moody, Erik de Bruijn, and, Alessandro Rubini, to mention a few.

In 2012 the member-run association Föreningen FSCONS was formed to take over the organisation of the conference from FFKP.

The conference continued to be held annually after 2012. FSCONS 2015 took place on 7–8 November at the University of Gothenburg’s Faculty of Arts. In 2017 the conference was held in Oslo, Norway on 4–5 November, expanding beyond its traditional Swedish location.

The conference has continued to be held annually in November. In 2017, FSCONS was held in Oslo, Norway, marking an expansion of the event beyond its traditional Gothenburg venue.

== Nordic Free Software Award ==
FSFE and is presenting the winner of the yearly Nordic Free Software Award, given to the person/project that have made a contribution to the advancement of Free Software in the Nordic countries. The jury consists of member from FSFE and Föreningen fri kultur och programvara (Free Culture and Software) and members from the free software community.

=== Winners ===
- 2007 : Skolelinux
- 2008 : Mats Östling
- 2009 : Simon Josefsson & Daniel Stenberg
- 2010 : Bjarni Rúnar Einarsson
- 2011 : Erik H. Josefsson
- 2012 : Otto Kekäläinen and Ole Tange
