= Brian Paul =

American software programmer

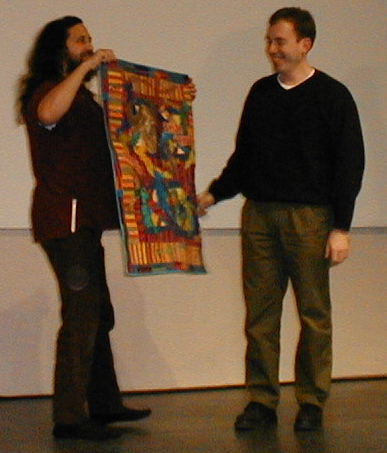
Brian Paul receiving the FSF Award for the Advancement of Free Software from Richard Stallman

Brian E. Paul is a computer programmer who originally wrote and maintained the source code for the open source Mesa graphics library until 2012, and is still active in the project. He began writing its source code in August 1993. Mesa is a free software/open source graphics library that provides a generic OpenGL implementation for rendering three-dimensional graphics on multiple platforms.

== Education ==
Paul obtained his bachelor's degree at the University of Wisconsin–Oshkosh in 1990. He worked on the SSEC Visualization Project while obtaining his master's degree at the University of Wisconsin–Madison.

== Mesa development ==
Paul was a graphics hobbyist. He thought it would be fun to implement a simple 3D graphics library using the OpenGL API. He spent eighteen months of part-time development before he released the software on the Internet. The software was well received, and people began contributing to its development. Graphics hardware support was added to Mesa in 1997 in the form of a Glide driver for the new 3dfx Voodoo graphics card.

== Career ==
Paul continued working on the SSEC Project after graduation. He has also worked for Silicon Graphics, Avid Technology, and Precision Insight (bought out by VA Linux Systems).

In 2000, Paul won the third Free Software Foundation Award for the Advancement of Free Software.

In November 2001, he co-founded Tungsten Graphics, which was acquired by VMware in December 2008, where he now works.

== Other contributions ==
Paul has also contributed to or written:

- Chromium
- Direct Rendering Infrastructure in XFree86
- Blockbuster – a high-res movie player for scientific visualization applications
- Glean – OpenGL validation
- Togl – an OpenGL widget for Tcl/Tk
- Vis5D visualization system
- VisAD visualization system
- Cave5D – an adaptation of Vis5D to immersive virtual reality
- TR – OpenGL tile rendering library
- V-Blocks – virtual building blocks
- Avid Marquee – video animation, 3D text, graphics
