= Matthew Garrett =

Irish technologist, programmer, and free software activist

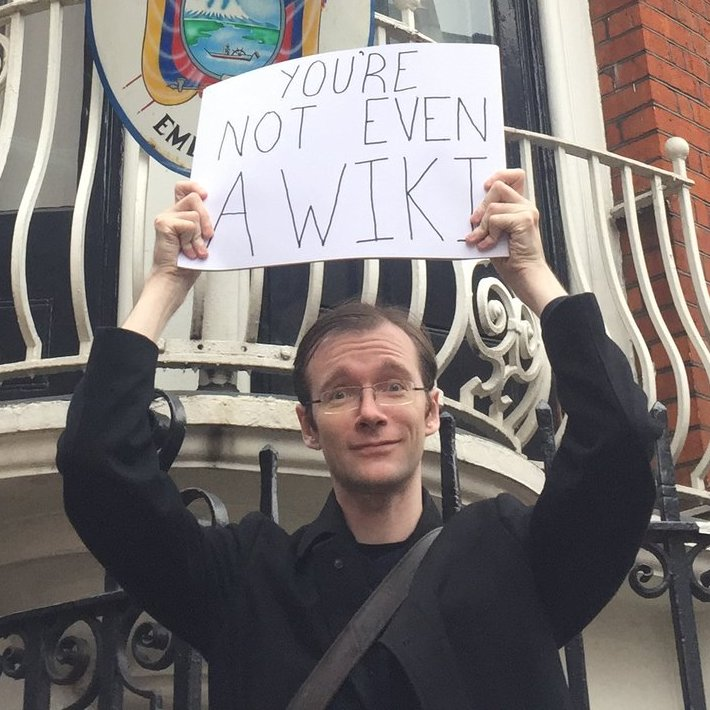
- Born: Galway, Ireland
- Other name: mjg59
- Education: University of Cambridge
- Occupation: Software developer
- Employer: NVIDIA
- Known for: Free software development and advocacy
- Awards: Free Software Award
- Website: mjg59.dreamwidth.org or codon.org.uk/~mjg59/blog/

Matthew Garrett is an Irish technologist, programmer, and free software activist who is a major contributor to a series of free software projects including Linux, GNOME, Debian, Ubuntu, and Red Hat. He has received the Free Software Award from the Free Software Foundation (FSF) for his work on Secure Boot, UEFI, and the Linux kernel.

== Life and career ==
Garrett was born in Galway, Ireland, and has a PhD in genetics from the University of Cambridge. He is the author of several articles on Drosophila melanogaster (i.e., fruit fly) genetics.

Garrett has been a contributor to GNOME and the Debian Linux projects, was an early contributor to Ubuntu, was an initial member of the Ubuntu Technical Board, worked as a contractor at Canonical Ltd., and worked at Red Hat.

At Canonical Ltd. and Red Hat, Garrett worked on power management in Linux. While at Red Hat, Garrett also worked on issues relating to Secure Boot and UEFI and the Linux kernel to preserve users' ability to run the operating system of their choosing on hardware supporting Secure Boot. This work eventually led to his being awarded the 2013 FSF Free Software Award.

Garrett worked at the cloud computing platform company CoreOS and is cited in the press as an expert in cloud computing issues. From 2017 until 2021, he worked for Google, followed by four years at Aurora. He is currently employed at NVIDIA as a Principal Security Engineer.

On January 9, 2023, Garrett was appointed to the Debian Technical Committee.

He has received the Free Software Award from the Free Software Foundation for his work on Secure Boot, UEFI, and the Linux kernel.

In November 2025, Garrett won a libel suit against the operators of the websites Techrights and Tuxmachines.

== Advocacy ==
Garrett has been a strong advocate for software freedom and compliance with the GNU General Public License (GPL) in the Linux kernel. For example, Garrett filed a complaint with US Customs against Fusion Garage due to violations of the GPL.

In March 2021, Garrett, who had served on the Free Software Foundation's board of directors, signed an open letter to the FSF calling for the removal of its entire board and for Richard Stallman to be removed from all leadership positions.
