= Fernanda G. Weiden =

Brazilian free software activist

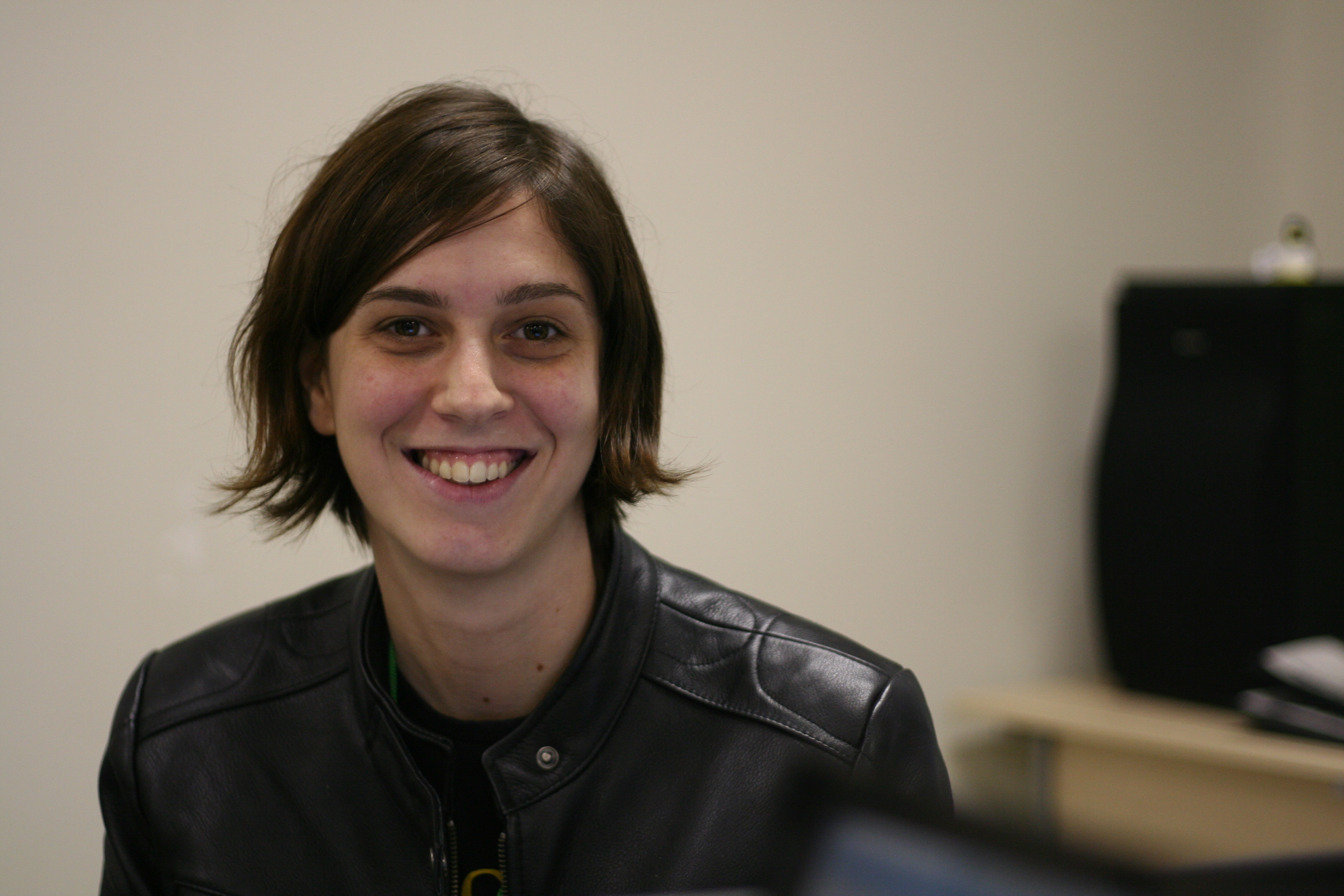
- Weiden in 2008
- Education: Imperial College London; Anhembi Morumbi University
- Occupation: chief technology product officer

Fernanda G. Weiden is a Brazilian free software advocate and chief technology product officer at Caju. She has worked for VTEX, Debian, Google and Facebook.

== Personal life ==
Fernanda Weiden was raised in Porto Alegre, Brazil. She studied at Imperial College London and Anhembi Morumbi University. She is married with two children and moved to Europe in 2019.

== Career ==
Weiden first became involved with the Free software movement in 1997 and became an advocate for free software. In June 2003, Fernanda Weiden and Loimar Vianna founded Projeto Software Livre Mulheres. She was a sponsored Debian contributor; she was a member of Debian Women and participated until 2011. In 2004, she started a thread complaining about the prospective package hot-babe, which featured drawings of a girl undressing.

On 16 September 2006, Weiden participated in two panels at Wizards of OS 4 in Berlin; she was one of the speakers in The Future of Free Software, together with Atul Chitnis and Federico Heinz. The previous day, Larry Sanger announced Citizendium; She was interviewed about the open source situation in Latin America. At FISL 12, Weiden managed a course for women about system administration. In FISL 15, she talked about failures in large-scale systems.

Weiden worked for six years at Google and then moved to Facebook, where she grew to became director of Production Engineering. After seven years at Facebook, she joined Brazilian company Unico. In September 2021, Weiden was promoted to the board of Unico, after previously being vice-president of engineering. The following year, she became chief technology officer at VTEX.

== Selected works ==
- Oliva, Alexandre; Weiden, Fernanda G. (2006). "DRM: Defectis Repleta Machina". Com Ciência.
