= Harald Welte =

German programmer

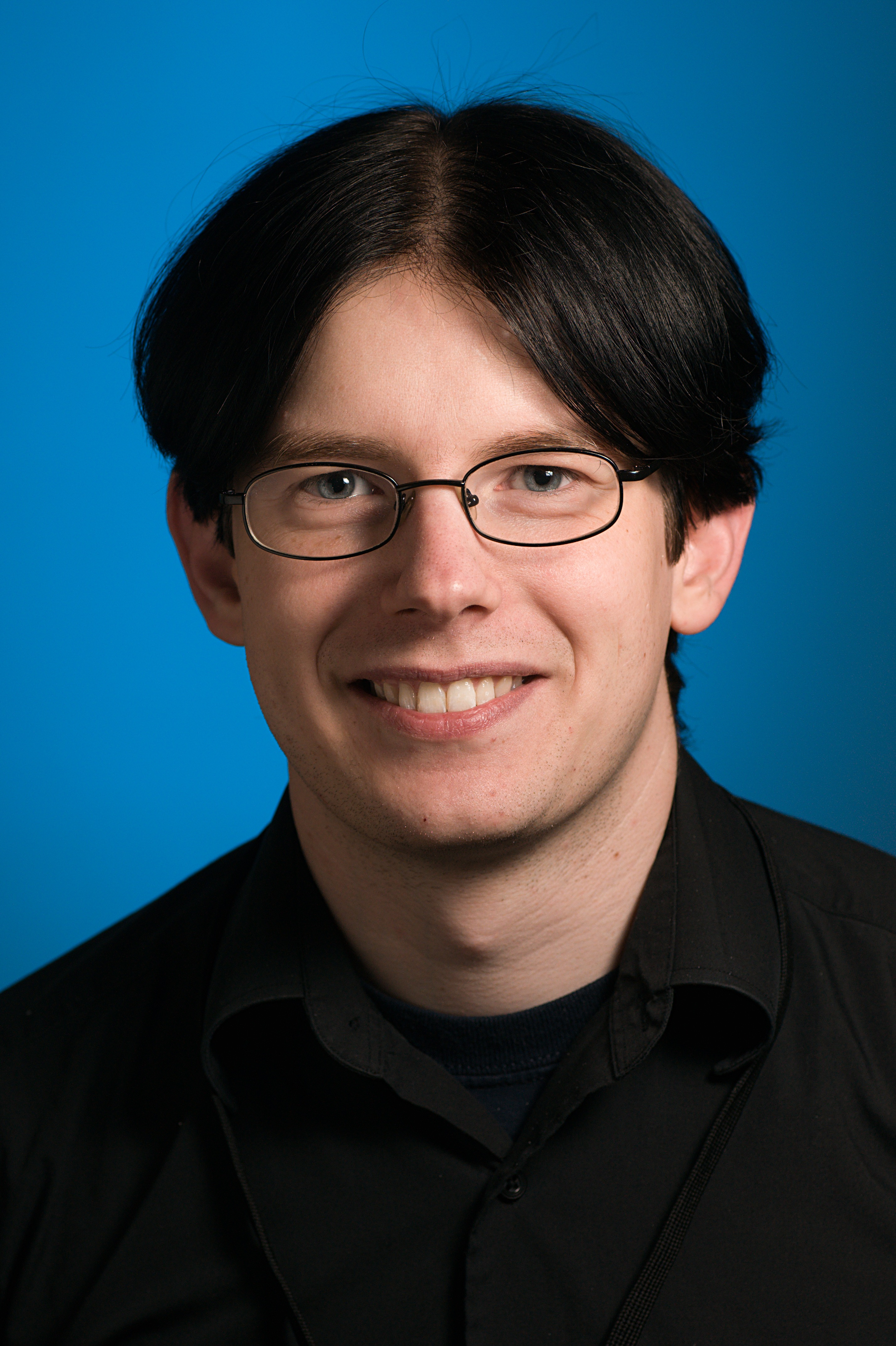
- Born: 1979 (age 46–47)
- Occupation: Programmer
- Website: https://laforge.gnumonks.org/weblog/

Harald Welte, also known as LaForge, is a German programmer.

Welte is the founder of the free software project Osmocom and was formerly involved in the netfilter/iptables and Openmoko projects. He is a member of the Chaos Computer Club.

== Biography ==
Until 2007, Welte was the chairman of the core team responsible for the netfilter/iptables project. He is also credited with writing the UUCP over SSL how-to, and contributions to User-mode Linux and international encryption kernel projects, among others.

Welte has become prominent for his work with gpl-violations.org, an organisation he set up in 2004 to track down and prosecute violators of the GPL, which had been untested in court until then.

Welte was part of Openmoko team, a project to create a smartphone platform using free software. However, in 2007, Welte announced his withdrawal from Openmoko, citing internal friction and demotivation. He continues to contribute as a volunteer to the project.

On 25 July 2008, VIA Technologies appointed Harald Welte as its open source liaison. According to VIA, in his role as open source liaison, Welte will be responsible for helping refine VIA's open source strategy and optimise its support for Linux. Welte will also "assist VIA to develop drivers that are in line with the standards and best practices of Linux kernel development, enhance the quality and public availability of VIA documentation, and improve interaction with the open source development community".

Welte is the founder of the Osmocom project.

== Awards ==
On 19 March 2008, the Free Software Foundation (FSF) announced that it had awarded the Award for the Advancement of Free Software for 2007 to Welte, stating that "The awards committee honored both Welte's technical contributions to projects like the Linux kernel and the OpenMoko mobile platform project, and his community leadership in safeguarding the freedom of free software users by successfully enforcing the GNU General Public License in over one hundred cases since the gpl-violations.org project began in 2004."

On 22 July 2008, Welte received the Defender of Rights Open Source Award, presented to him by Chris DiBona, who indicated the award was primarily for Welte's work on gpl-violations.org.
