= Frederick Noronha =

Indian journalist and writer (born 1963)

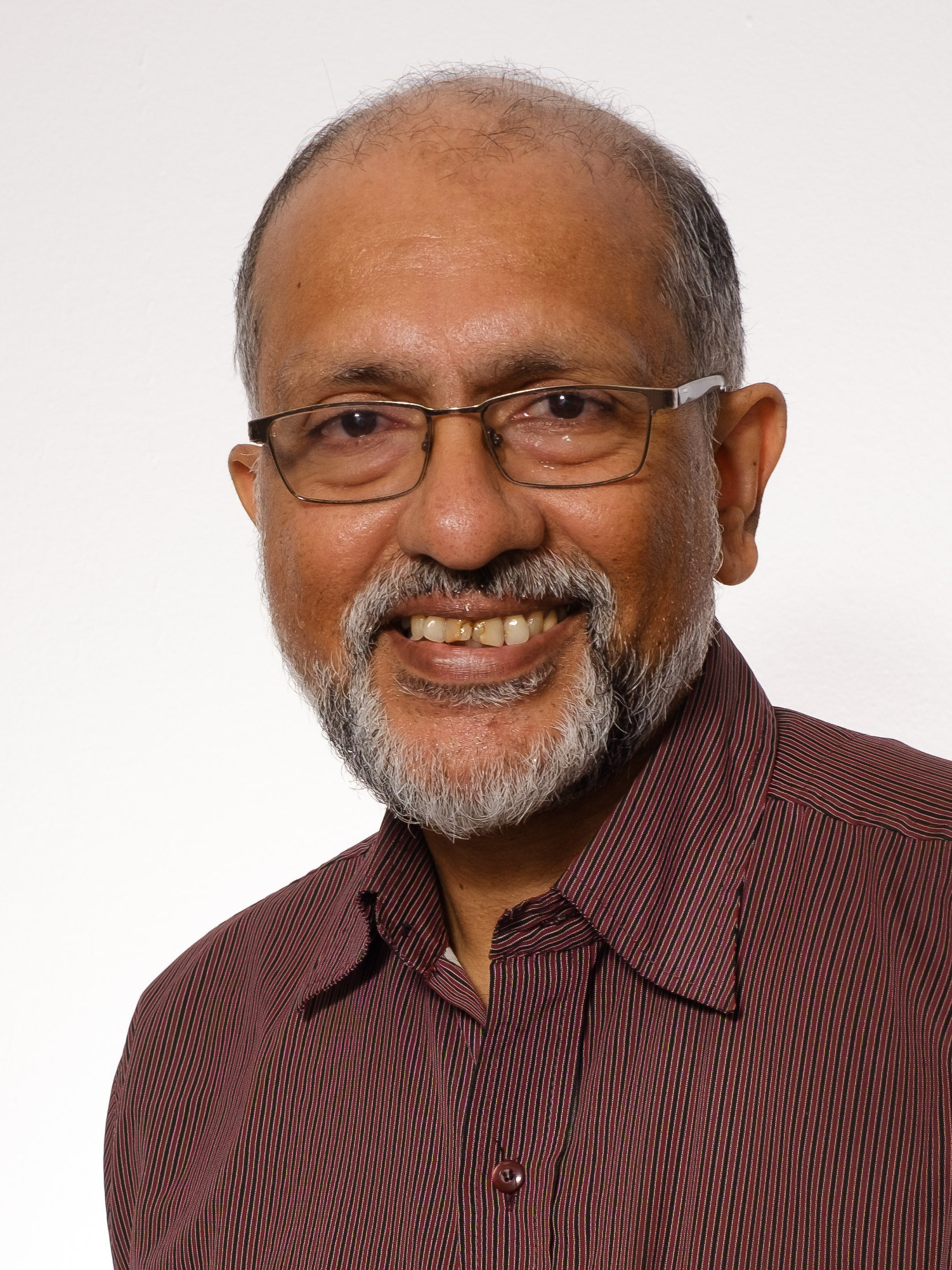
- Noronha in 2019
- Born: 23 December 1963 (age 62); São Paulo, São Paulo, Brazil
- Other name: Rico
- Education: Goa University; University of Bombay; International Institute for Journalism
- Occupations: Journalist; writer; publisher; Wikipedia editor
- Years active: 1983–present
- Title: Co-founder of BytesForAll

Frederick Noronha (born 23 December 1963) is an Indian journalist, writer, publisher, and Wikipedia editor based in Saligão, Goa. He is active in cyberspace and involved with e-ventures related to Goa, developmental concerns, and free software. Noronha primarily writes about free software/open-source issues, technology, and computing in India. He is the co-founder of BytesForAll and the founder of Goa 1556, an alternate publishing house.

== Education ==
Frederick Noronha received a B.Com. degree from Dempo College of Commerce and Economics, Panjim, and M.A. (English Literature) degrees from Goa University and the University of Bombay. In 2021 he took a PhD in English, focusing on publishing in twentieth-century Goa, via Goa University's Department of English (under Prof. Andre Rafael Fernandes).

Noronha is also an alumnus of the Internationales Institut für Journalismus (G57 course, 1990). He received a scholarship from the Institute for Further Education of Journalists (Fojo), Sweden (1998) and was a Sarai Print Media Fellow (2001). He was a Panos Fellow in 2001 (focusing on reproductive health and gender issues).

== Journalism ==
He has been a full-time journalist since 1983. From November 1987 to December 1994, Noronha was a staff correspondent for Deccan Herald. From 1994 onwards, he turned to a freelancer, and has written for India Abroad News Service (now Indo-Asian News Service), on news related to Goa and, more recently, Information Technology. He also worked as an editorial consultant with Herald (Goa) from October 2003 to April 2004.

He has written articles on Goa, Goan books, media, environment, development, and information technology. From 1996 to 2006, he has been part of the Admin Team of Goanet, a volunteer and not-for-profit network that links the Goan diaspora community. Publications that have featured Noronha's works include The Economic Times, The Financial Express, Spider Internet Magazine (Pakistan), Associated Press (photographs), Dawn, the BBC website and Outlook.

Noronha is a Wikipedia editor, particularly active on Konkani Wikipedia, and was named English Wikipedia's Editor of the Week in March 2020.

=== Online ventures ===
Together with Partha Pratim Sarkar of Bangladesh, Noronha co-founded BytesForAll. He is a supporter of copyleft-based models for sharing digital information and resources, with some 6000+ photographs, mainly related to Goa, available on his Flickr page.

== Involvement with FOSS movement ==
Noronha is a supporter of free software, and is actively involved in chronicling its growth in India and other Asian countries. His articles on Free Software have been published in Linux Journal and Free Software Magazine.

He has also participated in a study on FLOSS in the 'developing' countries (2003–04) in Finland. He has been a member of the panel deciding on the FSF Award for the Advancement of Free Software and The Manthan-AIF Award 2006. He has also spoken at many FOSS conferences, including FOSS.IN in 2006.

== Goa 1556 ==
On 20 June 2007, Noronha founded the alternate publishing house Goa 1556. As of 2018, it had published over 100 books in print and ebook form. All authors of books published are Goan and the topics published range from Goan history to Goan cuisine.
