= BytesForAll =

BytesForAll (also known as B4A or BfA) is a South Asian initiative to focus on how information technology and the internet can help in taking up social development issues. It is one of the oldest ICT4D (information and communication technologies for development) networks in South Asia. It was launched at a time when ICT4D was yet to become a buzz-word on the development circuit, and was still largely unnoticed for its potential.

== FLOSS-inspired ==
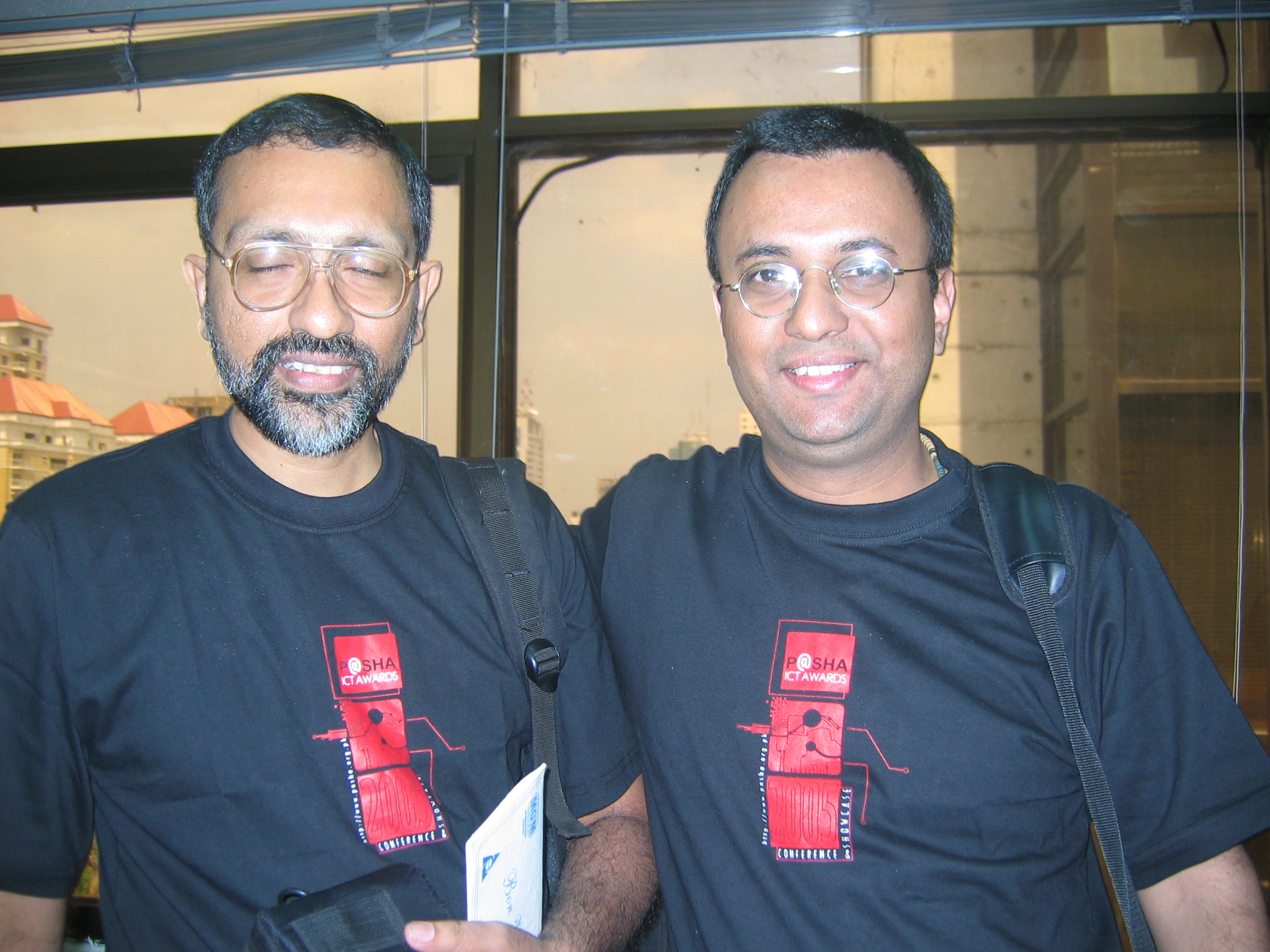
Co-founders of BytesForAll, Frederick FN Noronha (left) and Partha Pratim Sarkar (right), at an April 2006 APC-organized meet in Dhaka, Bangladesh.

BytesForAll was founded in July 1999 by Frederick Noronha of Goa, India and Partha Pratim Sarkar of Dhaka, Bangladesh. It is inspired by the Free/Libre and Open Source Software (FLOSS) model, and says it prefers to be an unfunded, volunteer-driven project.

In 2005, BytesForAll became the lone member of the Association for Progressive Communications or APC in South Asia.

== Mailing list ==
BytesForAll_Readers had some 1,548 subscribers as of October 2006, and describes itself saying it "is particularly designed for BytesForAll readers and supporters who want to take part and want to be updated about ICT and development-related issues in South Asia."

The BytesForAll mailings and discussions via its mailing list are summarised and published each month in the i4d magazine published from near New Delhi each month. BytesForAll has also shared contents and columns with the Spider internet magazine of Karachi, Pakistan (Dawn Media Group), and earlier with the Express Computer magazine of the Indian Express group of Mumbai, India.

== Among oldest ==
BytesForAll also describes itself as "being one of the oldest network on ICT4D issues in South Asia". Its mailing list, which is watched by a number of ICT enthusiasts and academics across the globe sees itself as a forum that "encourages a free flow of information and a lively debate and discussion on people-oriented IT practices."

The first issue of BytesForAll e-zine (July 1999) is archived online by the Inti.be website.

== Volunteers, team ==
Run by a volunteer administration team.

One of the goals of the BytesForAll project is to build people-to-people links across the diverse yet similar countries of South Asia, a region which is home to a huge population, but also faces a lot of political trouble at times.

BytesForAll is a virtual organisation which does not have a physical office or entity. Its members and volunteers interact via cyberspace, through email and occasional group chat sessions.

== News, criticism of South Asian ICT issues ==
BytesForAll has emerged as one of the credible sources of news and criticism of the ICT4D networks in South Asia. It is read by campaigners, activists at the grassroots, people involved with actual projects, funders, key players in the development debate and also academics in both South and North.

One of the early, tone-setting essays is titled When a Modem Costs More than a Cow and is by noted Dhaka, Bangladesh-based photographer Shahidul Alam who has founded Drik based in the locality of Dhanmondi. In it, Alam argues strongly a case for ICT and technology to reach the poor. He says, "Where information is power, denying information to marginalized communities, actively prevents the rural poor from overcoming the unequal power structures that they are trapped within. While it is in the interest of the powerful in society to restrict such access, it is also in the interest of the powerful nations to deny access and maintain domination. The unrestricted flow of general information is an essential pre-requisite for an egalitarian society."

== Covering the field ==
Over the years, BytesForAll has been intensively covering the field, mainly through its volunteer network of journalists and writers. BytesForAll has highlighted and tracked the growth of certain projects from South Asia, including the Hole In The Wall project, the Simputer, and free software (or FLOSS). BytesForAll has actively debated the growth of Free Software and Open Source in South Asia.

In mid-2006, BytesForAll set up its BytesForAll_FLOSS network to build links among supporters of FLOSS and techies dabbling in it, in South Asia.

Over the years, BytesForAll has been able to build links and bridges among techies and development activists (specially those with a tech focus) in the South Asian region.

Massachusetts Institute of Technology's Andrew W. Mellon Professor of Human Development in the Program in Science, Technology, and Society and Director of the MIT India Program Prof. Kenneth Kenniston has called BytesForAll "the single most valuable source of information on 'IT for the people' projects anywhere in South Asia."

== "Beyond the ... digital divide" ==
BytesForAll has argued that it goes "beyond the popular concept of digital divide. We not only recognize that there is a widespread disparity between information have and have-nots (in terms of access and distribution) but also raise and analyze the issues that put them trapped into it and bring about solutions wherever they exist." It adds that this network "want(s) to see how IT are being used for the benefit of the dis-empowered, one who has no purchasing power to tempt the market to build solutions for him or her."

BytesForAll has taken online issues relating to IT and public health, disaster mitigation, non-English computing, mass education and the like. It described its activities thus; "Each month an offline E-zine goes out to its interested readers. In doing so, it has managed to highlight a surprising number of often-unnoticed success stories from a region where access to computers is still a class privilege."

It has focused repeatedly on issues such as efforts to promote computing in regional languages through Linux; the Learn Foundation's experience in laying a knowledge pipeline in rural Bangladesh; PraDeshta's idea of deploying a broadband communication network in Bangladesh; SDNP Pakistan's success in developing a knowledge network within the country; Kothmale's implementation of innovative "community radio" services in rural Sri Lanka, among others.

Themes it has also focused on include IT-for-public health, Free/Libre and Open Source Software (FLOSS), ICT and human rights, emerging ICT technologies, community radio concerns, ICT for poverty alleviation, ICT for mass education, the knowledge society, local language computing initiatives, the "digital divide" generally, ongoing conferences and seminars in the region, and e-governance issues.
