= Sahana Software Foundation =

- Sahana Software Foundation logo
- Founded: 2009
- Founders: Paul Currion; Chamindra de Silva
- Type: Non-governmental organization
- Purpose: Disaster and emergency management
- Location: Los Angeles, California, United States
- Region served: Worldwide
- Method: Free and open-source software
- Key people: Devin Balkind, President
- Website: sahanafoundation.org

Sahana Software Foundation is a Los Angeles, California-based non-profit organization founded to promote free and open-source software (FOSS) for disaster and emergency management. The foundation's mission statement is to "save lives by providing information management solutions that enable organizations and communities to better prepare for and respond to disasters." The foundation's Sahana family of software products includes Eden, designed for humanitarian needs management; Vesuvius, focused on the disaster preparedness needs of the medical community; and legacy earlier versions of Sahana software including Krakatoa, descended from the original Sahana code base developed following the 2004 Indian Ocean tsunami. The word "Sahana" means "relief" in Sinhalese, one of two national languages of Sri Lanka.

== History ==
The Sahana Software Foundation's roots began after the Indian Ocean earthquake and tsunami on December 26, 2004, when a team of Sri Lankan technology workers associated with the Lanka Software Foundation (LSF) developed software that the government could use to coordinate assistance for those affected by the tsunami. Sahana was created for information management and collaboration in the aftermath. The software was designed to resolve common coordination problems during a disaster, including facilitating the search for missing people, aid and volunteer management, and victim tracking across refugee camps.

LSF, as the first owner of the intellectual property making up Sahana software, coordinated ongoing volunteer efforts to maintain the software, and managed the associated donated funds. Sahana software grew into a global free and open-source software project supported by hundreds of volunteer contributors from dozens of countries. It supported national and local authorities and relief agencies in their responses to numerous large-scale, sudden-onset disasters.

The software was originally deployed by the Sri Lankan government's Center of National Operations (CNO), which included the Center of Humanitarian Agencies (CHA). Additional funding was provided by the Swedish International Development Cooperation Agency (SIDA), IBM and the US National Science Foundation (NSF).

In early 2009, the directors of the Lanka Software Foundation decided to allow the Sahana group to spin off into its own organization. In 2009, the Sahana Software Foundation was established as a non-profit organization registered in the state of California. Mark Prutsalis was appointed as the group's first CEO.

In July 2014, the foundation announced that Michael Howden, a member of the board of directors, had been appointed as its new CEO.

Since September 2016, Devin Balkind has served as President.

== Sahana FOSS Disaster Management System ==
The Sahana Free and Open Source Disaster Management System is emergency management and disaster preparedness software developed by the Sahana Software Foundation. Conceived during the 2004 Sri Lanka tsunami to help manage the disaster, Sahana software was deployed by the Sri Lankan government's Center of National Operations (CNO), which included the Center of Humanitarian Agencies (CHA). Funding was provided by the Swedish International Development Agency (SIDA). The project has grown, with deployments during other disasters such as the Asian Quake in Pakistan (2005), the Southern Leyte mudslide disaster in Philippines (2006), the Jogjakarta earthquake in Indonesia (2006) and the 2010 Haiti earthquake.

Sahana currently has three projects: Eden, being developed in Python; Agasti, being developed in PHP; and the localization project, L10n.

=== Community Resilience Mapping Tool ===
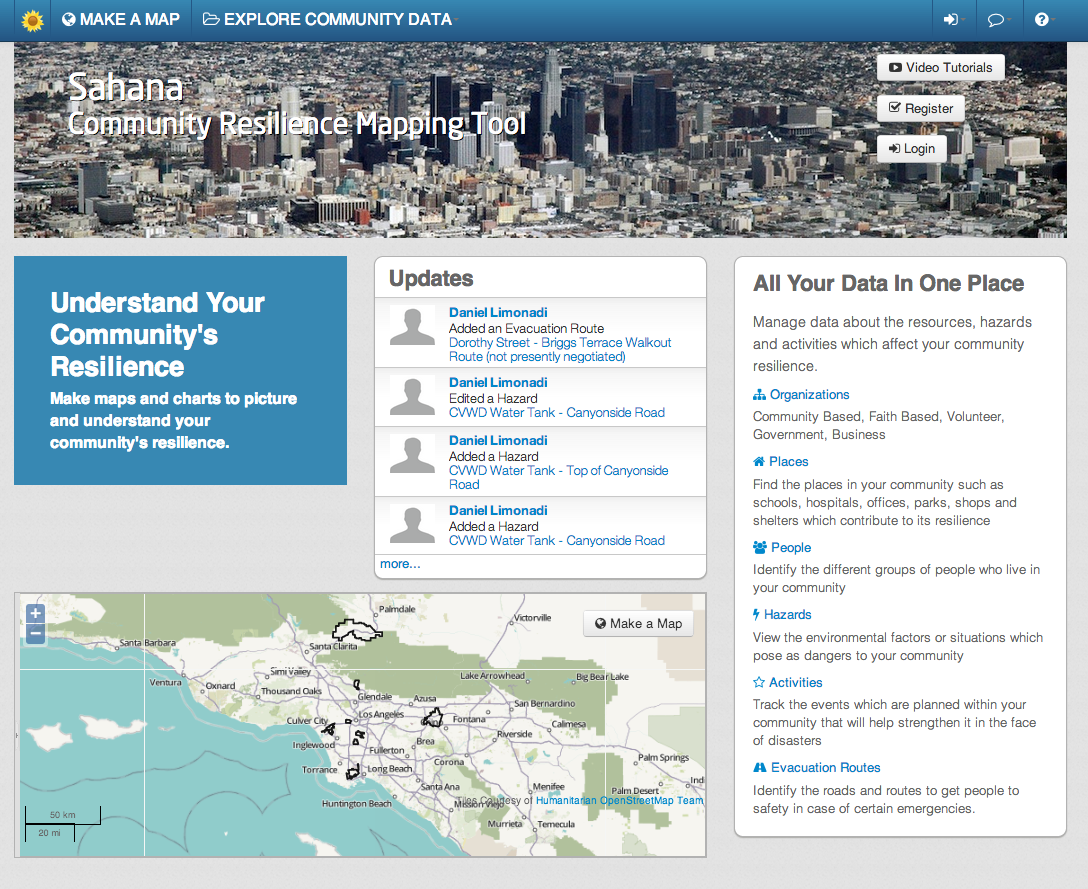
Screen shot showing the Sahana Software Foundation's Community Resilience Mapping Tool, developed for the County of Los Angeles

In 2012, the Los Angeles County Department of Public Health (LACDPH) and Emergency Network Los Angeles, a voluntary agency, reached out to nongovernmental community organizations working in disaster and pandemic preparedness to find a better way of communicating with LA County's diverse population, to build resilience. Along with the RAND Corporation, the nonprofit policy think tank, the groups started a project called Los Angeles County Community Disaster Resilience (LACCDR), to educate and engage community leaders to promote resiliency in Los Angeles County.

As part of the program, Sahana Software Foundation developed the Community Resilience Mapping Tool, to help communities collect data on vulnerabilities, hazards and resources within their own territories. The data allows communities to identify populations that could be affected by disasters, and plan the best way to allocate resources to help those people. Barriers like limited English proficiency, or low trust in public health, can be addressed through the tool.

=== Google Summer of Code project ===
From 2006 through 2014, Sahana has had a participating project in Google Summer of Code, a global program that offers student developers stipends to write code for various open-source software projects.

== Humanitarian-FOSS community ==
Sahana has developed into a community founded by a humanitarian consultant, Paul Currion, and the Sahana project lead, Chamindra de Silva. Much of their work is based on the more generic ideals of "humanitarian-FOSS", where the ideals of FOSS are applied for building humanitarian-ICT applications or applications built to help alleviate human suffering. The community consists of a mailing list and an active wiki with membership including emergency management practitioners, humanitarian consultants, crisis management academics, and free and open-source developers from around the world. Domain representation in this group includes members from ISCRAM, UNDP, Red Cross, IBM, Saravodaya (the largest NGO in Sri Lanka), and Australian Fire Services.

They have been recognized by the Free Software Foundation (FSF), where it inspired a new FSF Award for Projects of Social Benefit, which is broader in coverage than humanitarian-FOSS and by the UNDP IOSN on their Humanitarian-FOSS Portal.

== Deployments ==
In addition to the Sri Lankan government, Sahana software has also been officially deployed by the governments of the United States, Pakistan, the Philippines, Bangladesh, India, Taiwan, and China. It was also part of the Strong Angel III, a test of US civil and military disaster response.

Sahana software has been deployed in conjunction with the following disasters and aid organizations:

- Tsunami - Sri Lanka 2005 - Officially deployed in the Center of National Operations (CNO) for the Government of Sri Lanka.
- AsianQuake - Pakistan 2005 - Officially deployed with the National Database and Registration Authority (NADRA) for the Government of Pakistan.
- Southern Leyte mudslide disaster - Philippines 2006 - Officially deployed with the National Disaster Coordinating Council (NDCC) and the Office of Civil Defense for the Government of the Philippines.
- Sarvodaya - Sri Lanka 2006 - Deployed for Sri Lanka's largest NGO.
- Terre des Hommes - Sri Lanka 2006 - Deployed with new Child Protection Module for Switzerland-based Terre des Hommes, the county's largest private aid organization for children.
- Yogjakarta earthquake - Indonesia 2006 - Deployed by the Australian Computer Society (ACS), the Indonesian-based urRemote aid organization, and the Indonesian Whitewater Association and Indonesian Rescue Source NGOs.
- Peru earthquake - 2007 - Deployed and localized into Spanish.
- Myanmar cyclone - Myanmar 2008 - Deployed and localized into Burmese.
- Haiti earthquake - Haiti 2010 - Deployed and localized in Port-au-Prince and Haiti.
- Floods in Bosnia and Herzegovina, Serbia and Croatia 2014 - Deployed and localized in Bosnia, Serbia, and Croatia.

== Research ==
The Sahana Project has resulted in independent research projects. Professor Louiqa Raschid of the University of Maryland was leading a team in Sahana and Disaster Management research in 2013.

Sahana has been presented at numerous conferences, workshops, and events, and has had one paper accepted for an international conference; a paper on Sahana and Disaster Management was accepted for the 2nd International Conference on Information and Automation 2006. Due to the lack of previous research in ICT for disaster management, research has played a key role in Sahana's development.

== Awards and recognition ==
Sahana software was the recipient of the 2006 Free Software Foundation Award for Projects of Social Benefit. The award is presented to a free software project that intentionally and significantly benefits society through collaboration to accomplish an important social task.

Sahana software and its role supporting post-tsunami disaster relief in Sri Lanka were featured in the 2006 BBC World documentary The Code-Breakers.

In March 2010, the Sahana Software Foundation won non-profit disaster planning coordinator Private and Public Businesses, Inc.'s Best Practices Award, given for exemplary planning practices or responses to a critical incident. The award recognized the foundation's role under the leadership of former CEO Mark Prutsalis for providing coordination and support within 48 hours of the Haiti earthquake.

In April 2010, Sahana was recognized as one of four Cool Vendors in research company Gartner's annual Risk Management and Compliance report, citing Sahana's innovation.

In 2013, Sahana was recognized by the University of Maryland as "the world's leading open source software program for the rapid deployment of humanitarian response management", after its disaster management support role helping New York City police officers respond to Hurricane Sandy. The Sahana Software Foundation was recognized as a Computerworld Honors Laureate in the Human Services category for 2013.
