= European Committee for Interoperable Systems =

The European Committee for Interoperable Systems (ECIS) is an international non-profit association founded in 1989 in order to promote interoperability and market conditions in the Information and Communications Technology (ICT) sector allowing vigorous competition on the merits and a diversity of consumer choice. ECIS has represented its members on many issues related to interoperability and competition before European, national and international bodies, including the European Union institutions and the World Intellectual Property Organization (WIPO). ECIS members include large and smaller information and communications technology hardware and software providers as Adobe Systems, Corel Corporation, IBM, Linspire, Nokia, Opera Software, Oracle Corporation, RealNetworks, Red Hat, and Sun Microsystems.

== Involvement against Microsoft dominance ==
Over the past years, ECIS has been actively involved in the European Commission's antitrust condemnation against Microsoft, now upheld by the European Court of First Instance in September 2007.

Ziff-Davis' eWeek comments that

ECIS (European Committee for Interoperable Systems) again charged that Windows Vista would stifle innovation and competition. The group, founded in 1989, represents a Who's Who list of Microsoft competitors, including Adobe, Corel, IBM, Linspire, Nokia, Opera, Oracle, RealNetworks, Red Hat and Sun. Many of these same companies are Microsoft partners, too.

-

Other complaints about Microsoft include:

- That bundling XAML in Vista is an attempt to replace HTML by a Microsoft-specific technology
- That Office Open XML is a Microsoft-dependent document format

== See also ==
- Free Software Foundation Europe
- OpenForum Europe

=== Statements about the European Commission's antitrust case against Microsoft ===
- ECIS statement from Oct. 22 on the EU-MS agreement
- ECIS statement on the European Court First Instance (CFI) Microsoft judgment
- March 26, 2004 ECIS welcomes Commission Decision finding Microsoft infringed Article 82
