= Caju =

Caju may refer to:

- Caju, a river of Roraima state in northern Brazil
- Caju, a lower-class district of the Zona Norte (North Zone) of Rio de Janeiro
- Caju, the Portuguese name for the fruit of the Cashew tree
- Caju Cemetery, a necropolis in Rio de Janeiro

== People ==
- Caju (footballer, born 1915) (Alfredo Gottardi, 1915-2001), Brazilian footballer
- Caju (footballer, born 1949) (Paulo Cézar Lima), Brazilian footballer
- Caju (footballer, born 1995) (Wánderson de Jesus Martins), Brazilian footballer

== Other uses ==
- Samba Cajú, a town and municipality in Cuanza Norte Province in Angola
- 768325 Geyagugv, a trans-Neptunian object formerly nicknamed Caju

== See also ==
- Cajun (disambiguation)
