= Free Software Foundation Europe =

Foundation promoting Free Software movement

Free Software Foundation Europe e.V.
- Abbreviation: FSFE
- Formation: 10 March 2001 (25 years ago)
- Type: Charitable organization
- Legal status: German registered association (eingetragener Verein)
- Headquarters: Schönhauser Allee 6/7, Berlin, Germany
- Location: Hamburg, Germany
- Coordinates: 52.52950°N 13.41086°E
- Region served: Europe
- President: Matthias Kirschner
- Vice-President: Heiki Lõhmus
- Founding-President: Georg Greve
- Former Presidents: Georg Greve, Karsten Gerloff
- Main organ: Core Team
- Affiliations: FSF* network
- Budget: c. €600,000
- Website: fsfe.org
- Formerly called: FSF Europe

The Free Software Foundation Europe e.V. (FSFE) is an organization that supports free software and all aspects of the free software movement in Europe, with registered chapters in several European countries. It is a registered voluntary association (German: eingetragener Verein) incorporated under German law.

== History ==
FSFE was founded in 2001. It is the European sister organization of the US‑based Free Software Foundation (FSF), although each foundation exists as a separate organization.

In 2010, FSFE received the Theodor Heuss Medal in recognition of its work for freedom in the information society.

Following the return of Richard Stallman to the FSF in 2021, the FSFE declared themselves "unable to collaborate" with the FSF. In January 2026, after governance and leadership changes within the FSF, the FSFE announced it would resume collaboration.

Official "Public Money? Public Code" campaign video

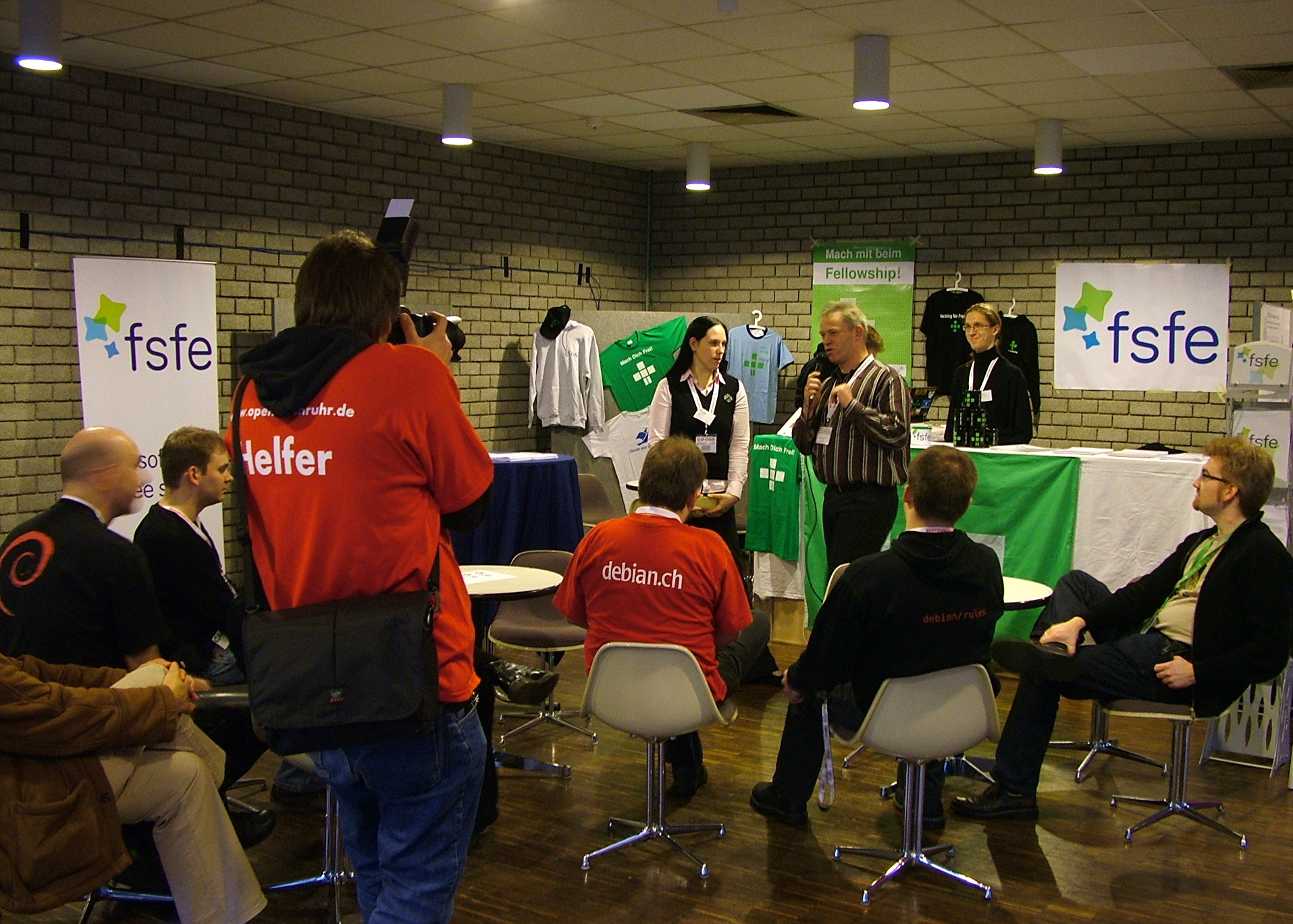
FSFE representatives at the OpenRheinRuhr, Bottrop, Germany in 2009

== See also ==
- European Committee for Interoperable Systems
- OpenForum Europe
- OpenUK
- Free Software Foundation (FSF)
