= Leonard H. Tower Jr. =

American activist

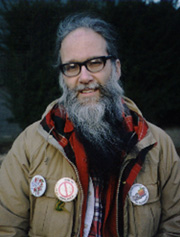
- Len Tower wearing League for Programming Freedom and "No Smoking" badges (c. 1996)
- Born: June 17, 1949 (age 77); New York City, U.S.
- Education: MIT
- Occupation: Free software activist
- Organizations: Free Software Foundation, League for Programming Freedom

Leonard "Len" H. Tower Jr. (born June 17, 1949) is a free software activist and one of the founding board members of the Free Software Foundation, where he contributed to the initial releases of gcc and GNU diff. He left the Free Software Foundation in 1997.

== Birth ==
Tower was born June 17, 1949, in Astoria, Queens, in New York City, U.S.

== Academic career ==
In 1971, Tower received an SB in biology from the Massachusetts Institute of Technology. During that time, he was business manager at The Tech, the student newspaper.

== GNU project ==
As the FSF's first full-time paid employee, Tower mostly performed administrative tasks, including managing mailing lists, newsgroups and requests for information.

In 1986, Tower assisted Richard Stallman with Stallman's initial plan to base the C compiler for the GNU Project on the Pastel compiler Stallman had obtained from Lawrence Livermore Lab. Tower worked on rewriting the existing code from Pastel, a variation of Pascal, into C while Stallman worked on building the new C front end. Stallman dropped that plan when he discovered the Livermore compiler required too much memory, concluding, "I would have to write a new compiler from scratch. That new compiler is now known as GCC; none of the Pastel compiler is used in it, but I managed to adapt and use the C front end that I had written." Stallman released his new GNU C compiler March 22, 1987, acknowledging others' contributions, including Tower's, who "wrote parts of the parser, RTL generator, RTL definitions, and of the Vax machine description" based on ideas contributed by Jack Davidson and Christopher Fraser.

Along with Mike Haertel, David Hayes and Stallman, Tower was also one of the initial co-authors of GNU diff, a file comparison utility based on a published algorithm by Eugene Myers.

During the late 1980s and early 1990s, Tower spoke at USENIX conferences as a representative of the FSF.

== League for Programming Freedom ==
Tower was an early member of the League for Programming Freedom. Through 1991, Tower was one of the organization's two most active speakers, along with Richard Stallman.
