= Tivoization =

Exercise of digital rights management on copyleft software

Tivoization (/ˌtiːvoʊɪˈzeɪʃən, -aɪ-/) is the practice of designing hardware that incorporates software under the terms of a copyleft software license like the GNU General Public License (GNU GPL), but uses hardware restrictions or digital rights management (DRM) to prevent users from running modified versions of the software on that hardware. Richard Stallman of the Free Software Foundation (FSF) coined the term in reference to TiVo's use of GNU GPL licensed software on the TiVo brand digital video recorders (DVR), which actively block modified software by design. Stallman believes this practice denies users some of the freedom that the GNU GPL was designed to protect. The FSF refers to tivoized hardware as "proprietary tyrants".

The Free Software Foundation explicitly forbade tivoization in version 3 of the GNU General Public License. However, although version 3 has been adopted by many software projects, the authors of the Linux kernel have notably declined to move from version 2 to version 3.

== Background ==
TiVo's software incorporates the Linux kernel and GNU software, both of which are licensed under version 2 of the GNU General Public License (GPLv2). GPLv2 requires distributors to make the corresponding source code available to each person who receives the software. One goal of this requirement is to allow users of GPL-covered software to modify the software to better suit their purposes.

Richard Stallman of the Free Software Foundation asserts that TiVo circumvented the GPL's goal by making their products run programs only if the program's digital signature matches those authorized by the manufacturer of the TiVo. While TiVo has complied with the GPL v2 requirement to release the source code for others to modify, any modified software will not run on TiVo's hardware.

Bradley Kuhn of the Software Freedom Conservancy disputes Stallman's narrative. Kuhn asserts that TiVo did not strictly forbid software replacement, but TiVo's proprietary software was intentionally designed to not function if any open-source components were replaced, which consequently required the user to find fully open-source alternatives to the proprietary software. In Kuhn's view, TiVo did not tivoize, the GPLv2 was already sufficient to prevent tivoization, and the intent of the GPLv3 was to add an additional, unnecessary requirement that proprietary software continue to function.

== GNU GPLv3 ==
In 2006, the Free Software Foundation (FSF) decided to combat TiVo's technical system of blocking users from running modified software. The FSF subsequently developed a third version of the GNU General Public License (GPLv3) which was designed to include language which prohibited this activity. According to Eben Moglen, "the license should prohibit technical means of evasion of its rules, with the same clarity that it prohibits legal evasion of its rules."

The second draft of the GPLv3 attempted to clarify the rules regarding tivoization. However, some Linux kernel developers were still concerned that this draft might still prohibit beneficial uses of digital signatures. Stallman and the Free Software Foundation attempted to respond to some of these concerns by stating that the GPLv3 allows private digital signatures for security purposes while still preventing tivoization.

In the third and fourth discussion drafts of the GPLv3, released March 28, 2007 and May 31, 2007, respectively, the anti-tivoization clause was limited so as not to apply when the software is distributed to a business. Thus, medical devices and voting machines would not be covered. The final, official GPLv3 was published on June 29, 2007, with no major changes in respect to tivoization relative to the fourth draft.

Linus Torvalds said he was "pretty pleased" with the new draft's stance on DRM. However, he still does not support relicensing the Linux kernel under GPLv3, stating that:

Stallman calls it "tivoization", but that's a word he has made up, and a term I find offensive, so I don't choose to use it. It's offensive because Tivo never did anything wrong, and the FSF even acknowledged that. The fact [is] that they do their hardware and have some DRM issues with the content producers and thus want to protect the integrity of that hardware. The kernel license covers the *kernel*. It does not cover boot loaders and hardware, and as far as I'm concerned, people who make their own hardware can design them any which way they want. Whether that means "booting only a specific kernel" or "sharks with lasers", I don't care.

The GPLv3's new license provisions were acknowledged by TiVo in its April 2007 SEC filing: "If the currently proposed version of GPLv3 is widely adopted, we may be unable to incorporate future enhancements to the GNU/Linux operating system into our software, which could adversely affect our business."

== Outcome ==
The Linux kernel, which is included in the operating system of TiVo-branded hardware, is still distributed under the terms of the GPLv2. The kernel has not been changed to use GPLv3 because the kernel maintainers have generally perceived the GPLv3 to be overly restrictive, although some kernel developers, such as Alan Cox, have expressed divergent opinions. In any case, offering the Linux kernel under a different license would likely be infeasible because of its very large number of copyright holders. Unlike most GPL software, the kernel is licensed only under GPLv2 without the wording "or, at your option, any later version", therefore the explicit agreement of all copyright holders would be required to license the kernel as a whole under a new version.

Some other projects, such as BusyBox, widely used in tivoized embedded systems have also declined to move to GPLv3.

== See also ==
- Vendor lock-in
- Defective by Design
