= XBill =

1994 video game

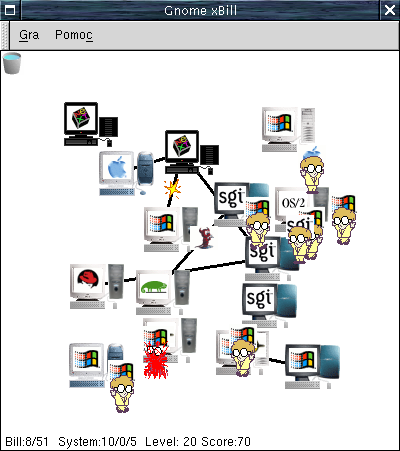
- Gnome XBill level 20
- Original authors: Brian Wellington and Matías Duarte
- Release: July 21, 1994; 32 years ago
- Stable release: 2.1 / November 15, 2001; 24 years ago
- Written in: C
- Platform: Linux, Microsoft Windows, Mac OS X, OpenMoko, Android, Maemo, iOS, FreeBSD, AmigaOS, BeOS, HaikuOS, OpenBSD, NetBSD, OS/2, Solaris, OpenSolaris.
- Type: Arcade game
- License: GPL (Emailware)
- Website: xbill.org
- Repository: sourceforge.net/projects/xbill/

XBill is an arcade style game for the X Window System. The game features a bespectacled character known as "Bill" (a spoof of Bill Gates). The goal is to prevent Bill's legions of clones, referred to as "micro-Bills", from installing "Wingdows", a virus "cleverly designed to resemble a popular operating system" (a parody of Windows), on a variety of computers running other operating systems. It was popular among Linux gamers at the end of the 1990s, selected as Linux Journal reader's second favourite Linux game in 1999.

== Gameplay ==
The player must defend various computers, including PCs running Linux and BSD, SPARCstations with Solaris, SGI IRIX workstations, Apple Macintoshs, PalmPilots, and NeXTcubes. The current operating system is shown by a logo on the computer's screen, which is ejected to the side when Bill installs Wingdows onto a computer.

Using the mouse, the player must squash Bill and drag discarded operating systems back to their computers. At the end of the level, points are accrued for every computer that is still running its original operating system.

On later levels, computers are connected to each other with LAN cables, allowing Wingdows to propagate through sparks running along the cables. These can be extinguished by dragging buckets of water onto them.

== History ==
The game was written by Brian Wellington and Matias Duarte in summer 1994. Originally written in C++, the code base was later with version 2.1 refactored to C.

The game was ported to Microsoft Windows in 1998. Ports to many other platforms as Mac OS X, Openmoko, Android, and Maemo phones followed due to its open source nature. Re-implementations of the game also exist.

In 2009, the project was resurrected as XBill-NG, similar in concept to Lincity-NG.

== Reception and impact ==
XBill was very popular among Linux gamers at the end of the 1990s, beating out Quake, though not Quake II, as Linux Journal readers' favourite Linux game in 1999.

The game holds four out of five stars on the Linux Game Tome and was noted by DesktopLinux.com.

Despite its status, it is not always packaged with Linux distributions due to its "disparaging" content: for instance Fedora does not package it, while Debian does.

Somewhat illustrating its notoriety, graphics from the game are used on the website of the 2009 Free Software Foundation campaign Windows 7 Sins.

== See also ==
- Neko (software)
- xTux
