= Pastel (disambiguation) =

Pastel is the art medium.

Pastel may also refer to:

- Pastel (color), color family
- "Pastel", an instrumental track by saxophonist Kenny G from his 1988 album Silhouette
- Pastel (manga), comic
- Pastel (programming language) extended version of Pascal
- Pastel (Twinbee), fictional character in video game
- Pastel Accounting, South African accounting software
- Pastel Memories, Japanese video game and anime series
- Pastel QAnon, Sub-community of QAnon followers

== Food ==
- Pastel (food), pastries
- Pastel (Brazilian food), Brazilian pasteis are sweet or savory thin crust pies that are a staple of Brazilian street food and fast food
- Pastil or pastel, a Filipino packed rice dish made with steamed rice wrapped in banana leaves with dry shredded beef, chicken, or fish
- Pastel de Camiguín or pastel, a Filipino soft bun with custard filling
- Chicken pastel, a Filipino creamy stew, sometimes baked in a pie

== People with the surname Pastel ==
- Grégory Pastel (born 1991), professional footballer

== See also ==
- The Pastels, band
- Pastille, type of candy or medicinal pill
- Postel, surname
