= CivicActions =

Technological support firm

- Founded: July 2004; 21 years ago
- Type: Limited liability company
- Location: Lafayette, California, United States of America
- Region served: USA
- Services: Open Source, Open Data, Drupal, DevOps, Training, Human Centered Design
- Fields: Civic technology Agile development Free software development
- Key people: Aaron Pava (Management & Operations); Henry Poole (Management & Operations)
- Employees: 100 – 150
- Website: civicactions.com

CivicActions, Inc. is a services firm that provides technological support with a focus on free and open-source software to agencies.

== History ==
CivicActions was founded as a Llc in 2004. Their focus was to provide hosted FOSS group forming network technologies to NGOs. They were the early adopters of Drupal (that they are a service provider now), Openwall Linux, and CiviCRM with its native mobile app CiviMobile. Over the period between 2004 and 2012, it's claimed that they have served over 175 organizations including Center for Reproductive Rights, American Public Media, Amnesty International, and Society for the Advancement of Chicanos/Hispanics and Native Americans in Science.

In 2014, CivicActions, with people in federal, state and local governments, founded AGL (Agile Government Leadership) and published the Agile Government Handbook. All of the work of AGL is published under public license, where it can be used by government workers, as well as other agile software vendors.

In early 2016, CivicActions co-founder Aaron Pava was recruited to join the United States Digital Service team in Washington DC to assist the federal government in transforming procurement practices to enable federal agencies to more easily procure services from small businesses like CivicActions. He returned to CivicActions in November 2016.

CivicActions was a founding member of the Digital Services Coalition.

=== Defective by Design ===
Gregory Heller and Henry Poole, who are both involved in Free Software Foundation and CivicActions, with the help of Peter T. Brown who was the president of FSF, have played major role in the formation of Defective by Design, an anti-DRM campaign advocating for elimination of digital restrictions.

== Work ==
=== Partnerships ===
CivicActions has worked with multiple entities — mostly United States government entities. In 2016, they worked with the Defense Security Cooperation Agency in creating GlobalNet, a collaboration and social media platform.. In 2017, CivicActions worked with California Polytechnic State University in creating their Digital Democracy platform. They also work with the Department of Education with the creation and maintenance of LINCS, an adult literacy website, and with the San Francisco Human Services Agency, with the creation of Eatfresh. Through Acquia, CivicActions also worked with the Department of Justice and the Department of Treasury. CivicActions has also worked on website modernization for the U.S. Department of Veterans Affairs and the Federal Communications Commission.

=== Services ===
CivicActions provides several services. Those are:

- UX
- Open Data
- Security & Compliance
- Support
- Drupal
- DevOps
- Education Services
- Quality Assurance
- Innovation Lab

== See also ==
- Defective by Design – a campaign supported by Henry Poole of CivicActions
- Free Software Foundation – associate of CivicActions
- Free open-source software – the philosophy behind CivicActions
