= Knauth =

Knauth is a surname. Notable people with the surname include:

- Felix Knauth (1895–1993), American writer and business executive
- Geoffrey Knauth, American free software programmer
- Michael Knauth (born 1965), American field hockey player
- Oswald Knauth (1887–1962), American economist and business executive
- Theodore Knauth (1885–1962), American investment banker, journalist and government official
- Victor Knauth (1895–1977), American journalist, publisher, and broadcasting executive
- Alix Deborah Knauth (1966- ), American residential designer
- Henry Martin Knauth (1889–1929), German-American athlete, businessman, and officer.
- Henry Martin Knauth (1922–2005), German-American Marine Corp Captain and Faulk Executive.
- Stephen Craig Knauth (1950– ), German-American poet and writer.
