= Mishi Choudhary =

American lawyer

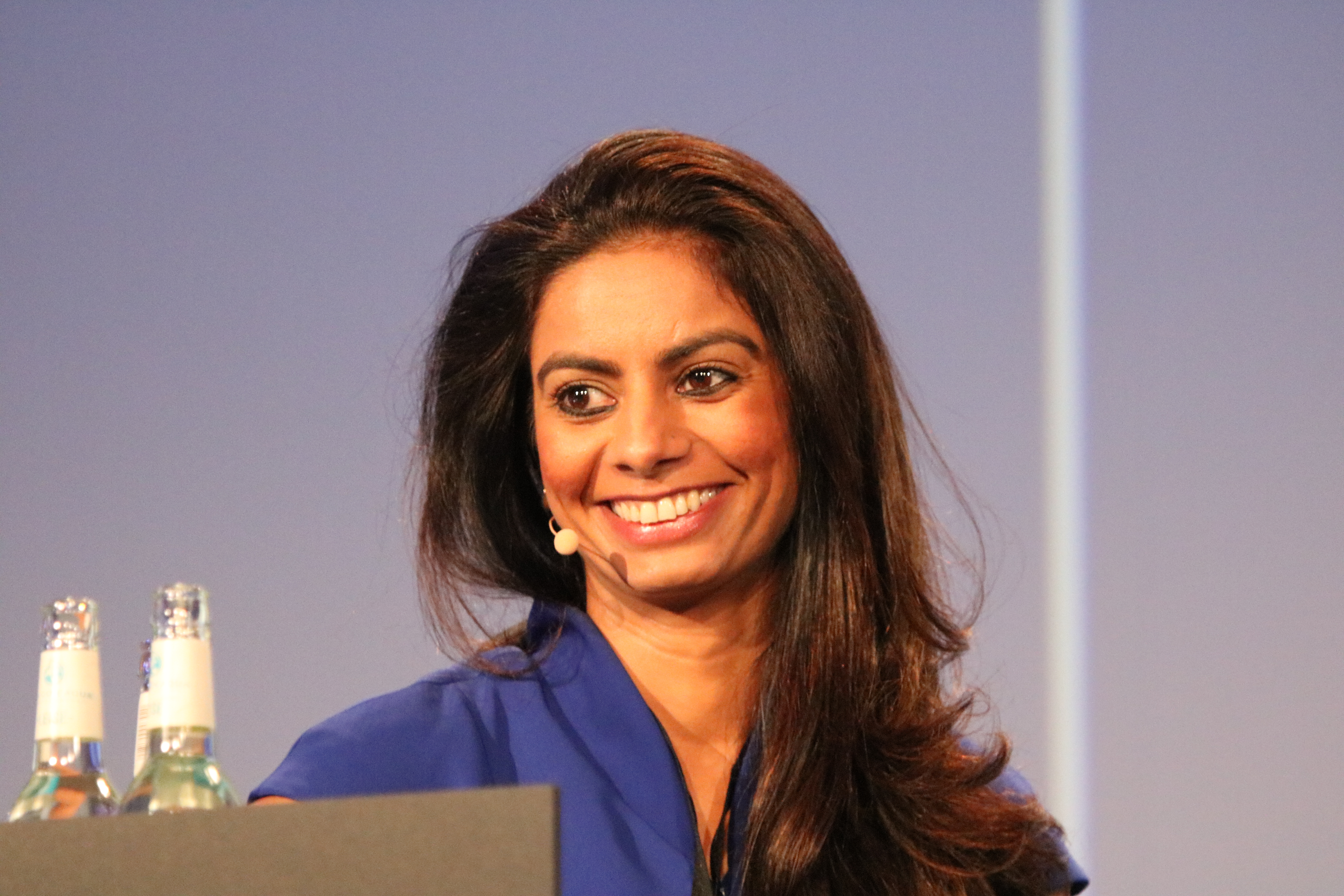
- Mishi Choudhary at the re:publica conference in Berlin, 2016
- Education: University of Delhi (LLB); Columbia Law School (LLM); Harvard Business School (Program for Leadership Development)
- Occupations: SVP & General Counsel of Virtru Corporation; Legal Director of Software Freedom Law Center; Founder of SFLC.in; Managing Partner at Mishi Choudhary & Associates LLP

Mishi Choudhary is a technology lawyer and online civil liberties activist working in the United States and India. She is the senior vice president and general counsel of Virtru, a role she started in 2022. Mishi was earlier the Legal Director of the Software Freedom Law Center as well as the founder of SFLC.in. SFLC.in brings together lawyers, policy analysts and technologists to fight for digital rights, produces reports, and studies on the state of the Indian internet, also has a productive legal arm. Under her leadership, SFLC.in has conducted landmark litigation cases, petitioned the government of India on freedom of expression and internet issues, and campaigned for WhatsApp and Facebook to fix a feature of their platform that has been used to harass women in India.

== Education ==
Choudhary earned a bachelor's degree in political science and an LLB degree with Honors from the University of Delhi. As the first Free and Open Source Fellow of the Software Freedom Law Center, she earned a Master of Laws degree from Columbia Law School where she was a Harlan Fiske Stone Scholar. In 2023, she earned the Program for Leadership Development, Executive MBA equivalent from Harvard Business School.

== Career ==
Choudhary started her career as a litigator at the Delhi High Court and the Supreme Court of India. Following the completion of her Free and Open Source Fellowship, she started working with Software Freedom Law Center as a Counsel. She served as the Director of International Practice from 2011 to 2013. In July, 2013 she was appointed the Legal Director of SFLC. At SFLC, she served as the primary legal representative of many of the world's most significant free software developers and non-profit distributors, including Debian, Free Software Foundation, Kodi (software), the Apache Software Foundation, and OpenSSL. She continues to serve some of these projects along with established businesses and startups, Governments using free software in their products and service offerings in the US, Europe, India, China and Korea. As of 2017, she is the only lawyer in the world to appear simultaneously on briefs in the US and Indian Supreme Courts in the same term. She was one of the lead counsels in Shreya Singhal v. Union of India representing Mouthshut.com in which the Supreme Court of India delivered a landmark verdict, ruling Section 66A of the Information Technology Act, 2000 as unconstitutional.

In 2018, she launched her technology law and policy practice "Mishi Choudhary And Associates".

== Honors and awards ==
In 2015, she was named one of the Asia Society's 21 young leaders building Asia's future for her work as a technology lawyer and online civil liberties activist. In 2016, the Aspen Institute named her as a Fellow of the sixth class of the Kamalnayan Bajaj Fellowship and a member of the Aspen Global Leadership Network. In 2017, she won a Digital Women Award in the "Social Impact" category for her work with SFLC.in. In 2017, the Open (Indian magazine) listed her as a Freedom Fighter and one of the emerging legal guardians of the Free Internet. She is also current member of code of Conduct Committee for Linux Kernel.
