= Software Freedom Law Center =

Pro bono legal organization for developers

- Type: 501(c)(3)
- Location: New York City, USA
- Fields: Software
- Key people: Chairman: Eben Moglen
- Website: softwarefreedom.org

The Software Freedom Law Center (SFLC) is an organization that provides pro bono legal representation and related services to not-for-profit developers of free software/open source software. It was launched in February 2005 with Eben Moglen as chairman. Initial funding of US$4 million was pledged by Open Source Development Labs.

A news article stated:

Moglen expects — in fact, plans for — a large turnover in the staff. After five years, he anticipates 20 to 30 lawyers will have passed through the Center. By the time these alumni move on, Moglen hopes that its members will have the expertise to advise both communities and corporations alike. It will also create a loose association whose members can consult with each other as necessary.

== GPL version 3 ==
SFLC represented and advised the Free Software Foundation, one of its principal clients, throughout the process of drafting and public discussion of version 3 of the GNU General Public License (GPLv3) during 2005–2007. Along with FSF president Richard M. Stallman, SFLC director Eben Moglen and then-SFLC counsel Richard Fontana were principal authors of GPLv3, LGPLv3, and the GNU Affero General Public License.

== BusyBox litigation ==
During 2007 and 2008, SFLC filed a series of copyright infringement lawsuits against various defendants, on behalf of Erik Andersen and Rob Landley, the principal developers of BusyBox. These lawsuits claimed violations of version 2 of the GNU General Public License (GPLv2).

On September 20, 2007, SFLC filed a lawsuit against Monsoon Multimedia, Inc. alleging that Monsoon had violated GPLv2 by including BusyBox code in their Monsoon Multimedia HAVA line of products without releasing BusyBox source code. This is believed to be the first U.S. court case in which the complaint concerned a GPL violation. On October 30, 2007, an SFLC press release announced that the lawsuit had been settled with Monsoon agreeing to comply with the GPL and pay a sum of money to the plaintiffs.

On November 20, 2007, SFLC filed a lawsuit against Xterasys Corporation and High-Gain Antennas, LLC. On December 17, 2007, SFLC announced a settlement with Xterasys; the company agreed to stop product shipments until it published complete source code for the GPL code and to pay an undisclosed sum to the plaintiffs. The suit against High-Gain Antennas was settled on March 6, 2008, with the company agreeing to comply with GPL and paying an undisclosed sum to the plaintiffs.

On December 7, 2007 SFLC filed a lawsuit against Verizon Communications, Inc. alleging that Verizon had violated GPLv2 by distributing BusyBox in the Actiontec MI424WR MoCA wireless routers bundled with the FiOS fiber optic bandwidth service, without providing corresponding source code. A settlement announced on March 17, 2008, included an agreement to comply with the GPL and an undisclosed sum paid to the plaintiffs.

On June 10, 2008, SFLC announced the filing of lawsuits against Bell Microproducts, Inc. and Super Micro Computer, Inc.

On December 14, 2009, SFLC announced the filing of a lawsuit on behalf of its clients, Software Freedom Conservancy and Erik Andersen, against 14 companies, including Best Buy, Samsung, and Westinghouse alleging these companies had violated GPLv2 by distributing BusyBox in some of their products without releasing BusyBox source code. For instance, Samsung released its LN52A650 TV firmware in 2010, which was used later as the base for the community SamyGO project.

By 21 September 2013, all of the defendant companies had agreed on settlement terms with the plaintiffs, except for Westinghouse, against whom default judgment was entered.

== Cisco lawsuit ==
On December 11, 2008, SFLC announced the filing of a lawsuit on behalf of its client, the Free Software Foundation, against Cisco Systems, Inc. This lawsuit was the first suit ever initiated by the Free Software Foundation,. On May 20, 2009, the parties announced a settlement.

== Staff ==
As of May 2020, SFLC's staff included:

- Eben Moglen, President and Executive Director
- Mishi Choudhary, Legal Director
- Tanisha Madrid-Batista, Chief Operating Officer
- Daniel Gnoutcheff, Systems Administrator

== Directors ==
As of May 2020, SFLC's directors were:

- Eben Moglen
- Diane M. Peters
- Daniel Weitzner

== Former staff ==
- Richard Fontana, Counsel
- Jim Garrison, Public Relations Coordinator
- Bradley M. Kuhn, Policy Analyst and Technology Director
- Matt Norwood, Counsel
- Jonathan D. Bean, Counsel
- Daniel J. Byrnes, Counsel
- Albert Cahn, Counsel
- Daniel B. Ravicher, Legal Director
- Karen M. Sandler, General Counsel
- James Vasile, Counsel
- Rachel A. Wiener, Office Manager
- Justin C. Colannino, Counsel
- Aaron Williamson, Counsel
- Marc Jones, Counsel

== Clients ==
- SFLC adds Wine to client list
- Press Release: SFLC to represent the Wine project (see also Wine)
- X.Org Foundation Hires Software Freedom Law Center
- SFLC to represent Plone and the Plone Foundation (see Plone)
