= William John Sullivan =

American software programmer

John Sullivan
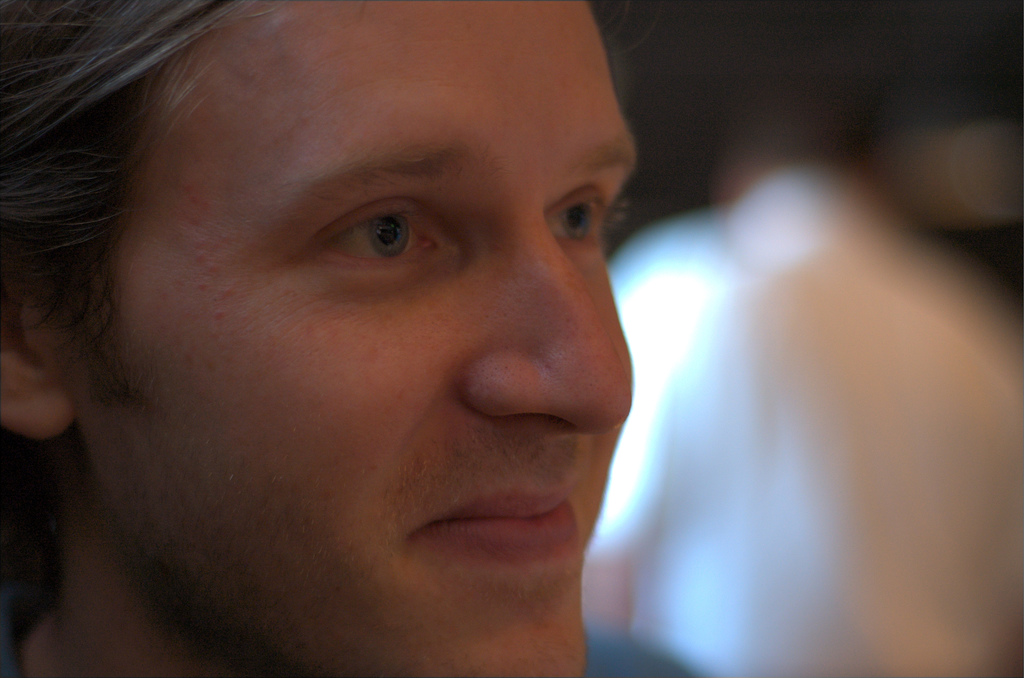
- Sullivan at Free Software Foundation event, June 2006.
- Born: December 6, 1976 (age 49)
- Employer: Free Software Foundation

William John Sullivan (more commonly known as John Sullivan; born December 6, 1976) is a software freedom activist, hacker, and writer. John was formerly executive director of the Free Software Foundation (FSF), where he has worked since early 2003. He is also a speaker and webmaster for the GNU Project. He also maintains the Plannermode and delicious-el packages for the GNU Emacs text editor.

== Biography ==
Active in both the free software and free culture communities, Sullivan has a BA in philosophy from Michigan State University and an MFA in Writing and Poetics. In college, Sullivan was a successful policy debater, reaching finals of CEDA Nationals and the semifinals of the National Debate Tournament.

Until 2007, John was the main contact behind the Defective by Design, BadVista and Play Ogg campaigns. He also served as the chief webmaster for the GNU Project, until July 2006.

He served as Executive Director of the Free Software Foundation from 2011 to 2022.

== As a speaker for the GNU Project ==
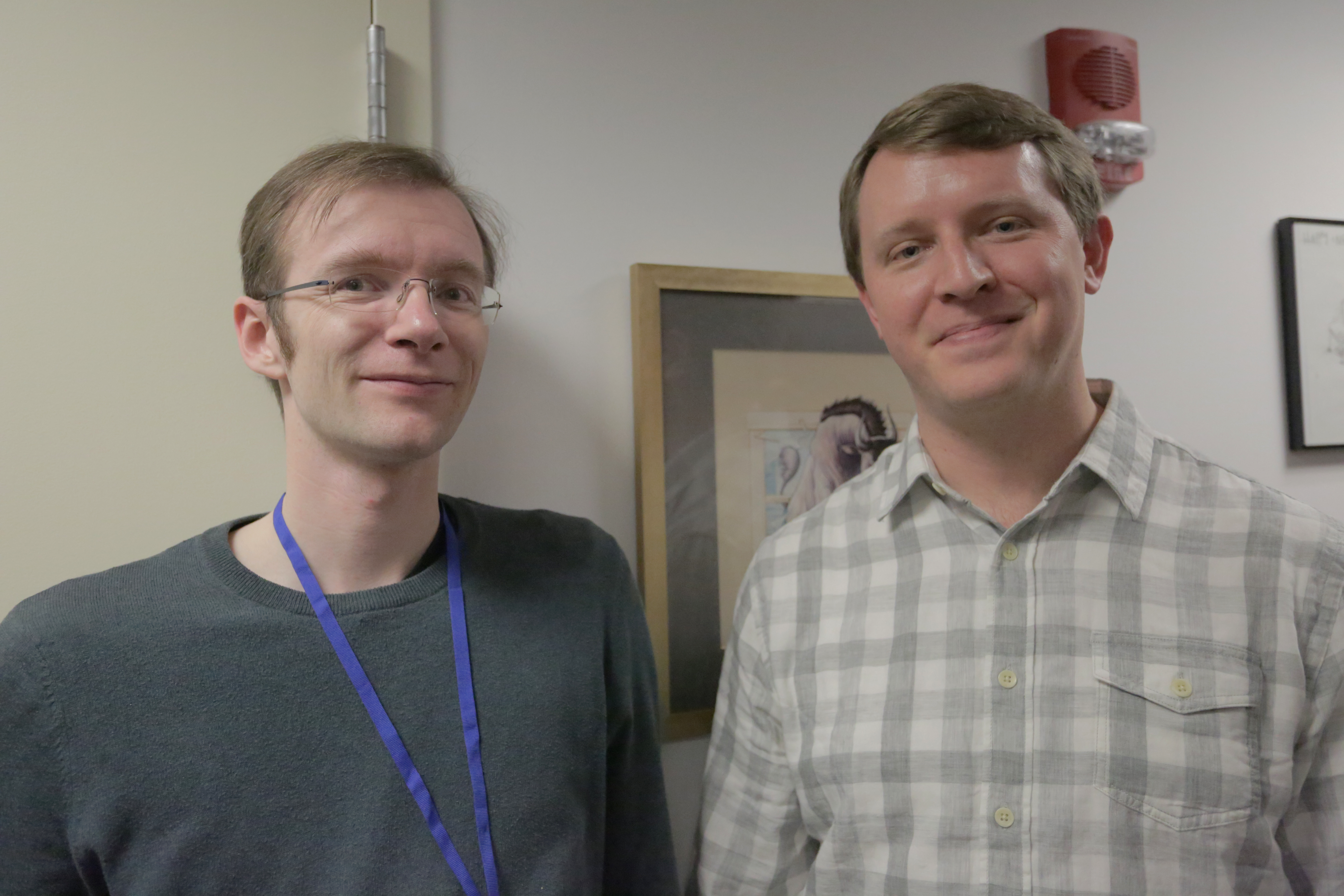
Matthew Garrett and John Sullivan at LibrePlanet 2016

John has delivered speeches on the following topics, in English:

- Digital rights management issues and the FSF's Defective by Design campaign
- Media format patents, proprietary licensing, and the FSF's PlayOgg.org campaign
- Choosing free software over Microsoft Windows
- How you can help: Strategies for communicating and organizing around free software ideals
- Why software should be free
- Introduction to the GPLv3 and free software licensing
- FSF/GNU high-priority free software projects
