= Bradley M. Kühn =

American free software activist

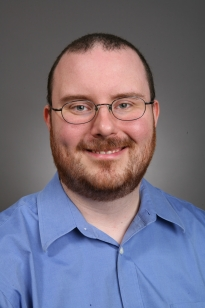
- Kühn in 2007
- Born: 1973 (age 52–53); Baltimore, Maryland, U.S.
- Occupations: Policy Fellow and Hacker-in-Residence, Software Freedom Conservancy
- Scientific career
- Education: Loyola College in Maryland (BS); University of Cincinnati (MS)
- Known for: Perl6; GNU Affero General Public License
- Awards: 2012 O'Reilly Open Source Award, 2020 Advancement for Free Software Award
- Fields: Computer science
- Workplaces: Free Software Foundation; Software Freedom Law Center; Software Freedom Conservancy
- Thesis: Considerations on Porting Perl to the Java Virtual Machine (M.S. thesis) (2001)
- Academic advisors: John Franco
- Website: https://www.ebb.org/bkuhn/

Bradley M. Kühn (born 1973) is a free software activist from the United States.

Kühn is currently Policy Fellow and Hacker-in-Residence of the Software Freedom Conservancy, having previously been executive director. Until 2010 he was the FLOSS Community Liaison and Technology Director of the Software Freedom Law Center (SFLC). He previously served as the Executive Director of Free Software Foundation (FSF) from 2001 until March 2005. He served on the FSF's board of directors from March 2010 until October 2019.

He is best known for his efforts in GPL enforcement, as the creator of FSF's license list, and as original author of the Affero General Public License. He has long been a proponent for non-profit structures for FLOSS development, and leads efforts in this direction through the Software Freedom Conservancy. He is a recipient of the 2012 O'Reilly Open Source Award.

== Academia and early career ==
Kühn attended Loyola Blakefield, followed by Loyola College in Maryland, graduating in May 1995 with a summa cum laude Bachelor of Science in Computer Science.

Kühn attended graduate school in Computer Science at the University of Cincinnati and received a Master of Science degree in 2001 under the direction of his graduate advisor John Franco. Kühn received a USENIX student grant scholarship for his thesis work, which focused on dynamic interoperability of free software languages, using a port of Perl to the Java Virtual Machine as an example. Larry Wall served on Kühn's thesis committee. Kühn's thesis showed various problems regarding the use of stack-based virtual machines for Perl, and this discovery became part of the justification for the launch of the Parrot project.

Kühn was an active participant in the Perl6 RFC Process, and headed the perl6-licensing committee during the process. The RFCs on licensing were all written by him.

Kühn taught AP Computer Science at Walnut Hills High School for the 1998–1999 academic year, using a Linux-based lab built by the students themselves.

Kühn volunteered for the Free Software Foundation throughout graduate school, and was hired part-time as Richard Stallman's assistant in January 2000. Kühn is seen posting to lists in his professional capacity around this time. During his early employment at the FSF, Kühn suggested the creation of and maintained the FSF license list page, and argued against license proliferation.

Kühn was also an early and active member of the Cincinnati Linux User Group during this period, serving on its board of directors in 1998 and giving numerous presentations.

== Non-profit career ==
Bradley Kühn's computer science career briefly involved proprietary software development after high school. His sour experience in this area was one of his motivations for sticking with a career in non-profit work. Since graduate school, Kühn has worked only for non-profits. He was hired full-time to work at the FSF in late 2000, and was promoted to executive director in March 2001. Kühn launched FSF's Associate Membership campaign, formalized its GNU General Public License (GPL) enforcement efforts into the GPL Compliance Labs, led FSF's response to the SCO lawsuit, authored the Affero clause of the original version of the AGPL, and taught numerous CLE classes for lawyers on the GPL.

Kühn left the FSF in March 2005 to join the founding team of the Software Freedom Law Center with Eben Moglen and Daniel Ravicher, and subsequently established the Software Freedom Conservancy in April 2006.

At both the FSF and SFLC, Kühn has been involved with all the major efforts in the United States to enforce the GPL. At SFLC, he assisted Eben Moglen, Richard Stallman, and Richard Fontana in the drafting of the GPLv3, and managed the production of the software system for the GPLv3 Comment Process, called stet. He advocated strongly for inclusion of the Affero clause in GPLv3, and then assisted with the production of the AGPLv3 after the FSF decided to write a separate Affero version of GPLv3.

Prior to 2010 Kühn was FLOSS Community Liaison and Technology Director of the Software Freedom Law Center and was president of the Software Freedom Conservancy. In October 2010 he became the Conservancy's first Executive Director. After leadership change he now serves as Policy Fellow and a member of the Board of Directors, while Karen Sandler holds the Executive Director position

In 2010 Kühn founded the Replicant project together with Aaron Williamson, Graziano Sorbaioli and Denis ‘GNUtoo’ Carikli, aiming at replacing proprietary Android components with free software counterparts. Kühn is in fact the Registrant of the Replicant.us domain.

Since October 2010 Kühn has co-hosted, with Sandler, the Free as in Freedom podcast, which covers legal, policy, and other issues in the FLOSS world. Kühn and Sandler had previously co-hosted a similar podcast, the Software Freedom Law Show.

On March 20, 2021, he received the 2020 Advancement for Free Software Award.

== Poker ==
Kühn is an avid poker player and played professionally on a part-time basis from 2002 to 2007. Since January 2008, he has been a contributor to PokerSource, a GPL'd online poker system written and maintained by Loïc Dachary.
