= Defective by Design =

Anti-DRM initiative

- Website type: Grassroots campaign
- Available in: English
- Owner: Unknown
- Creator: Free Software Foundation
- Revenue: No
- Website: www.defectivebydesign.org
- Commercial: No
- Registration: No
- Launched: May 24, 2006; 20 years ago
- Current status: Online
- Content license: CC BY-ND 3.0

Defective by Design (DBD) is a grassroots anti-digital rights management (DRM) initiative by the Free Software Foundation (FSF) and CivicActions. Launched in 2006, DBD believes that DRM (which they call "digital restrictions management") makes technology deliberately defective, negatively affects digital freedoms, and is "a threat to innovation in media, the privacy of readers, and freedom for computer users." The initiative regularly campaigns against the use of DRM by the media industry and software industry to increase awareness of the anti-DRM movement and pressure industries into no longer using DRM. They are known for their use of hazmat suits in their demonstrations.

DBD represents one of the first efforts of the FSF to find common cause with mainstream social activists and encourage free software advocates to become socially involved. As of late 2006, the campaign was claiming over 12,000 registered members.

== Position ==
According to their website, DBD believes that DRM is used to control how consumers use the technology they are meant to own, as well as who can produce and distribute media—which the DBD equates to book burning—while conducting mass surveillance of media consumption habits. They argue that DRM "is designed to take away every possible use of digital media, regardless of legal rights, and sell some of these functionalities back as severely limited services."

DBD argues that DRM does not help, but rather hurts authors, publishers, studios, labels, and similar media producers and suppliers—especially those in independent media—by forcing them to work with distribution services that are difficult to switch away from. They also argue that DRM is not meant to prevent copyright infringement as claimed by proponents and is in fact completely separate from copyright, as if DRM really was used for those purposes, "every distribution method for that particular piece of media would have to be distributed by an uncrackable DRM-encumbered distribution platform, which is impossible on its own."

Rather, DBD states DRM only helps technology companies and media conglomerates that profit from these by forcing producers and suppliers to remain working under them while also forcing users to continue using their services, regardless of the associated hassles and costs (such as having to maintain an internet connection with always-on DRM, or having to pay for otherwise basic features), by enforcing significant negatives of attempting to switch to other services, share media on DRM-protected services, or modify DRM-protected technology. DBD suggests that this way, DRM is a form of monopolization. DBD also argues that DRM allows these companies to micromanage media and control how they are distributed, even to the point of arbitrarily making media unavailable or deleting digital copies of said media from those who own it.

== History ==
Defective By Design is a joint effort by the Free Software Foundation and CivicActions, a company that develops online advocacy campaigns. The chief organizers are Gregory Heller of CivicActions, Peter T. Brown, executive director of the FSF, and Henry Poole, a CivicActions member who is also a director of the FSF.

The campaign was launched in May 2006, with an anti-DRM protest at WinHEC. The protest featured FSF members in yellow hazmat suits "handing out pamphlets explaining that Microsoft products are – in the words of the key slogan for the campaign – 'defective by design' because of the DRM technologies included in them".

Since then, the campaign has launched a number of actions with varying degrees of success. The campaign claims that its phone-in campaign against the Recording Industry Association of America and related organizations around the world resulted in thousands of calls from people questioning the industry's position on DRM. On the other hand, efforts to meet with Bono of U2, a prominent supporter of Apple's DRM-regulated iTunes, have so far met with no success. However, four major record labels dropped their pending lawsuits and joined with Apple and Microsoft to eliminate DRM from music sales.

DBD proclaimed October 3, 2006, to be a "Day Against DRM", and organized several events outside key Apple stores in the US and the UK. Hazmat suits were again worn by protesters and leaflets were handed out to the public explaining Apple's use of DRM in their iTunes music store and on their iPod media players.

On January 30, 2007, the campaign organized along with the BadVista campaign at the Times Square. Protesters in hazmat suits then handed literature to attendants about the dangers of Windows Vista's DRM and Trusted Computing features, as well as handing out CDs containing a free software replacement for Windows Vista.

== Campaigns ==
DRM-free label

=== Tagging campaign ===
Since 2007, the Defective by Design site encourages users to use the tagging feature of Amazon.com, Slashdot and on other sites that allow tagging, to mark certain products with the 'defectivebydesign' tag. Items targeted include DVD players, DRM-restricted DVD titles, HD DVD and Blu-ray Disc titles, Windows XP and higher, the Zune, and the iPod.

=== #CancelNetflix campaign ===
In 2013, the Defective by Design site started a tagging campaign against Netflix, an online commercial streaming service that developed new implementations of DRM for the web, to challenge W3C's decision of introducing DRM to web technologies. Despite the popularity of the campaign, W3C showed greenlight for DRM.

== See also ==
- Broadcast Protection Discussion Group
- Free Software Foundation anti-Windows campaigns
- Planned obsolescence
- Tivoization
- Trusted Computing
- Enshittification
- Dead Internet theory
