= Richard Fontana =

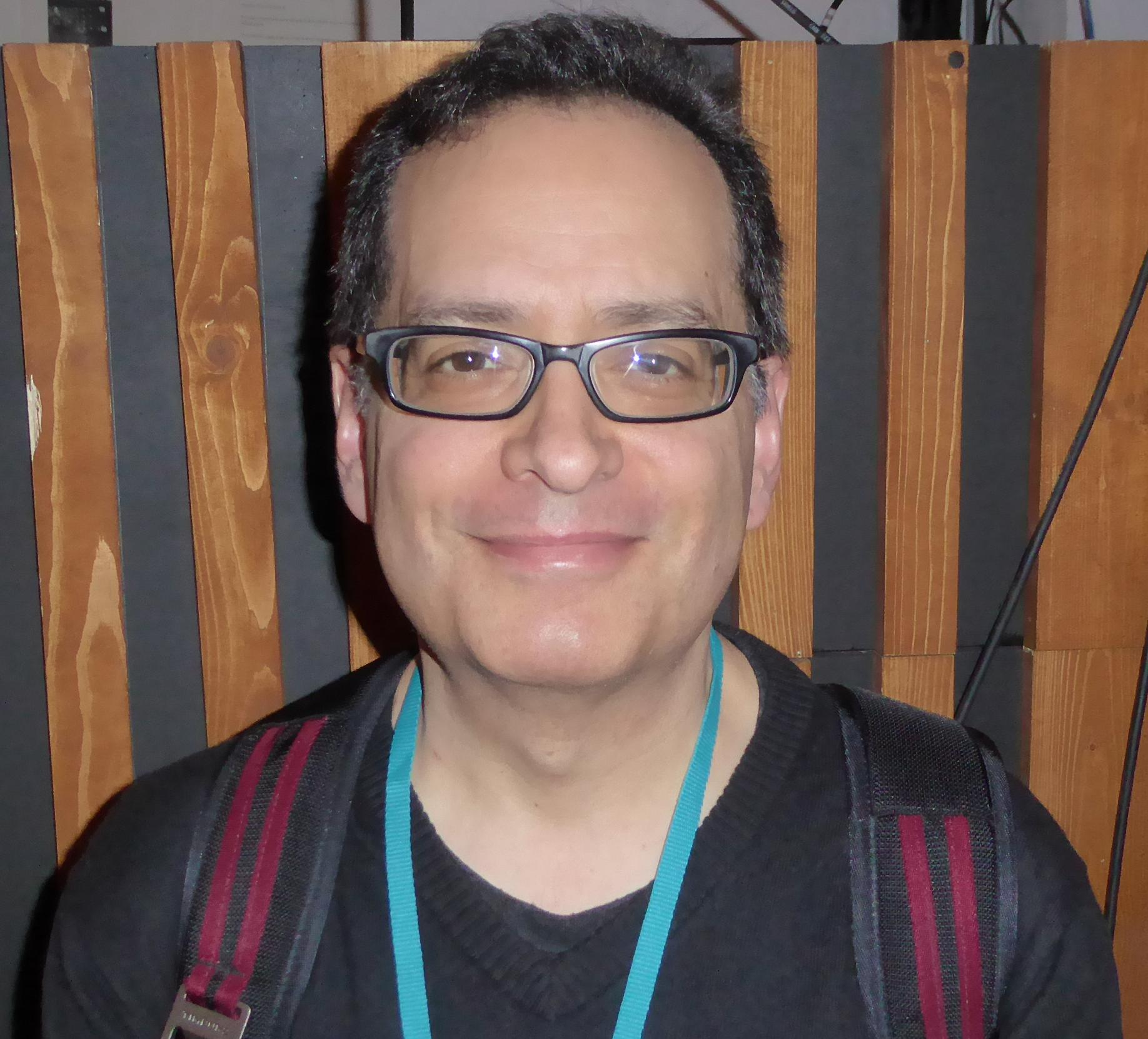
- Born: (United States) Brooklyn, NY, U.S.
- Occupation(s): Lawyer, Red Hat

Richard Fontana is a lawyer in the United States who is particularly known for his work in the area of open source and free software. Fontana works at Red Hat. Before Red Hat he was counsel at the Software Freedom Law Center (SFLC). In 2012 Fontana began drafting copyleft-next, a modification of the GNU General Public License, version 3 (GPLv3). While at SFLC, Fontana was one of the three principal authors, along with Richard Stallman and Eben Moglen, of the GPLv3, the GNU Lesser General Public License, version 3 (LGPLv3), and the GNU Affero General Public License. He was a director of the Open Source Initiative from 2013 to 2019.

Fontana attended Hunter College High School in New York City. He received a bachelor's degree in history from Wesleyan University, a master's degree in computer science from Yale University, and a Juris Doctor degree from the University of Michigan Law School.
