= Neko (software) =

Animated cursor-chasing cat program

Animation sprites of Neko falling asleep and waking up

Neko, also known as Oneko, is a cross-platform open-source screenmate application that creates an animated sprite of a cursor-chasing cat, which has been ported across a wide variety of systems.

Neko (猫, ねこ) is the Japanese word for cat.

== History ==
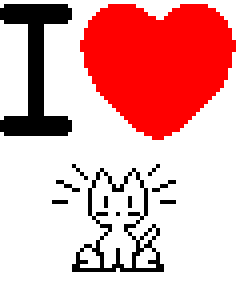
I love Neko!

Neko was originally a TSR written for the NEC PC-9801 called NEKO.COM made by Naoshi Watanabe (若田部 直). It utilized the PC-98's separate graphics and text layers to draw a cat on the graphics layer, letting CLI apps run while Neko chased the text cursor. It only moved in the cardinal directions, lacking diagonal movement. When it reached the cursor it would paw at it, eventually falling asleep when left idle.

In 1989 it was ported as a Desk Accessory for the Macintosh by Kenji Gotoh (後藤寿庵) as NekoDA. It featured a new sprite-sheet, the ability to change the cat's speed, and to change the cursor into prey for the cat; a bird, mouse, or fish. The cat was restrained to a window, when the cursor was outside of it Neko would scratch at the borders. The name NekoDA has a double meaning, "DA" both being an acronym for Desk Accessory; and "だ" as in the verb "to be", Nekoだ meaning "It's a cat!".

Kenji Gotoh was approached by IBM during the development of OS/2 2.1, selling non-exclusive rights to the Neko sprites for ¥300,000, used in their own version of the application, called Cat and Mouse, releasing in 1991.

A version for the X Window System was made in 1990 by Masayuki Koba (古場正行) called xneko which allowed you to change the cat's color and size. Later that year Tatsuya Kato ported xneko to Unix systems as oneko, letting it roam around the entire desktop instead of inside a window, notify the user of received emails, and hide underneath a kotatsu.

In 1997 David Harvey ported xneko to Windows 95 and 98 with Neko for Windows, or Neko95/Neko98. This version could run multiple nekos at once, play sound effects, change the sprite-sheet, lay footprints; and behave differently, like running away from the mouse or wandering the desktop on its own.

== Other versions ==
The NekoDA sprites made by Gotoh and the code of many of its following ports are free to use, modify, and redistribute. As such Neko has been ported to many other systems.

=== Windows, Linux, and Mac OS ===
- Two Windows 3.x versions were made in 1991, Michael Bankstahl's WNEKO; and Dara T. Khani's Neko Runs Free.
- A shareware port titled Cat! or Cat95! was made for Windows 3.1 and Windows 95 by Robert Dannbauer in 1991, it cost $5 to register the shareware after the 30 day trial period, which also granted extra features.
- Neko98 was recompiled for x64 Windows in 2010.
- A Wayland port is available called Wayneko for Linux
- A Neko character is available for the Linux toy AMOR (Amusing Misuse Of Resources).
- A Neko desktop accessory for the Apple II Desktop v1.3 is available
- It has been ported to Mac OS X. There is also a screensaver called Neko.saver.

=== Mobile ===
- There is an Android port, ANeko. There is also a live wallpaper for Android called Xnekodroid.
- A Windows Mobile 6.5 port was made by Jayson Ragasa.
- A port named NekoCat was made by Laurent Duveau for Palm OS.

=== Web ===
- In 2004 Gregory Bell made WebNeko in Javascript for people to add to their websites. An iPhone port of WebNeko was made in 2010.
- Another JavaScript version named Oneko.js was made in 2022 and is used on various personal websites, as well as having been used to bring Oneko to Firefox as an extension, the modded Spotify client Spicetify, the modded Discord client Vencord, and more.
- An Opera GX mod of Neko as a virtual pet is available.

=== Other ===
- A Java Swing port is available.
- Neko was available on Acorn Computers' RISC OS.
- A port was made by Carl Revell for the Amiga Computer called Ameko in 1997, based on Neko Runs Free.
- There is also a Neko screensaver for NEXTSTEP.
- A BeOS version using their replicants feature called Neko the Replicat exists.
- There is version for the Arduino micro controller touchscreen boards.

== Other appearances ==
- In 1995, a shareware game for the Macintosh called Kitten Shaver had used sprites that looked similar to Neko. The object of the game was cruel but humorous, as the player would have to shave the cats, with various layers of fur, as they ran across the screen within a limited time. The game was a parody of a game called Bunny Killer. Kitten Shaver was such a success, that a sequel called Kitten Shaver 2: Kitty's Revenge was released in 1997.
- Neko appears as an animated, directional paintbrush in Tux Paint.
- In 2007, after Todd Goldman admitted to committing plagiarism by copying a webcomic panel into a painting and labeling the painting as his work, other bloggers accused Goldman of copying Neko and using it as "Goodbye Kitty." Goldman denies these allegations.

== See also ==
- XBill
