= Libre Software Meeting =

The Libre Software Meeting (LSM) was an annual free software event originally held in France. The French name of this event is Rencontres mondiales du logiciel libre (RMLL).

== Summary ==
The Libre Software Meeting took place in July yearly from the year 2000 until 2018 (2016 was skipped). Launched by the French free software users group Association Bordelaise des utilisateurs de logiciels libres (ABUL). More than 1000 people, coming from more than 50 countries, participate each year.

The LSM was a mix of two complementary meetings:

- a developers meeting, free software coders coming to discuss about their projects during the event
- a free software promotion event dedicated to a large audience

== Organisation ==
The LSM was organized by a team of volunteers, combining local and national free software associations.

== Villages ==
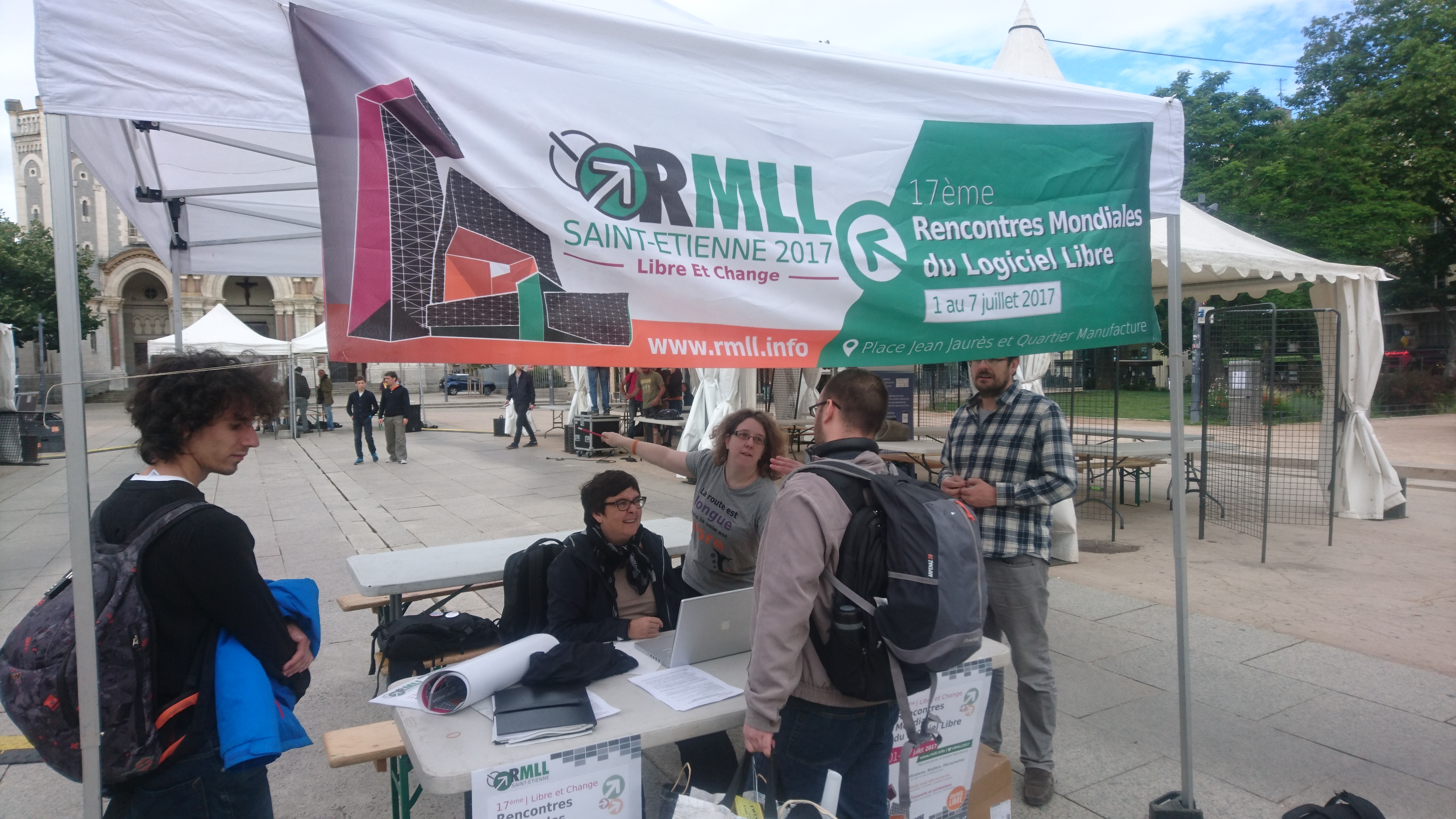
Village of the associations, LSM 2017

The village of the associations welcomed the visitors with a set of stands presenting local or national associations.

== Hosting cities ==
Year	Date	Host city
2000	5 to 9 July	Bordeaux, France
2001	4 to 8 July	Bordeaux, France
2002	9 to 13 July	Bordeaux, France
2003	9 to 12 July	Metz, France
2004	6 to 10 July	Bordeaux, France
2005	5 to 9 July	Dijon, France
2006	4 to 8 July	Vandœuvre-lès-Nancy, France
2007	10 to 14 July	Amiens, France
2008	1 to 5 July	Mont-de-Marsan, France
2009	7 to 11 July	Nantes, France
2010	6 to 11 July	Bordeaux, France
2011	9 to 14 July	Strasbourg, France
2012	7 to 12 July	Geneva, Switzerland
2013	6 to 11 July	Brussels, Belgium
2014	5 to 11 July	Montpellier, France
2015	4 to 10 July	Beauvais, France
2016		No candidate
2017	1 to 7 July	Saint-Étienne, France
2018	7 to 12 July	Strasbourg, France
2019		No candidate

== Logo ==
The LSM logo was drawn with Sketch by André Pascual, Linuxgraphic.org co-creator, for the LSM 2001. The choice of the mascot and her name come from the homophony with Armelle (a French feminine first name) and RMLL, as pronounced in English.

== See also ==
- List of free-software events
- LibrePlanet
