= Peter T. Brown =

Free software activist

Peter Brown
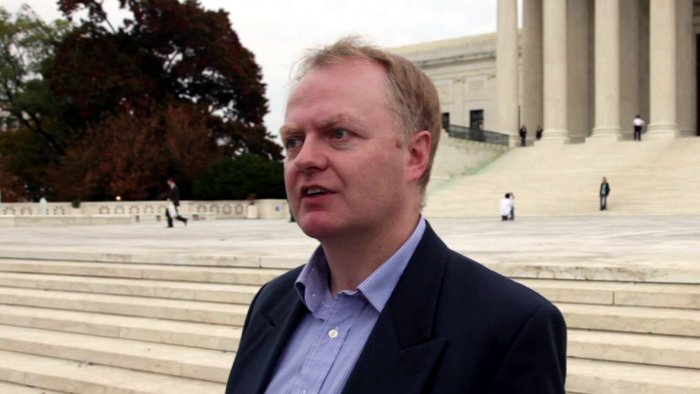
- Brown in 2010
- Born: Peter Brown
- Occupations: Activist; former executive director
- Known for: Free software movement; FSF

Peter T. Brown was the executive director of the Free Software Foundation (FSF) from 2005 until early 2011. Having come from a business management and finance background, he began working for the organization in 2001 as a comptroller, and was promoted to executive director in 2005 after the departure of Bradley Kuhn. He was replaced by John Sullivan. He has since joined the Software Freedom Conservancy as a director and treasurer. He is from Oxford, England.

Previously, Brown also held roles as the Financial Controller at FSF and manager of the GPL Compliance Lab. Additionally, he served as a director at New Internationalist and worked at BBC Radio in London.

He became an American citizen in August 2017.
