= Henry Poole (technologist) =

Henry Poole is a technologist and social entrepreneur, CEO of CivicActions and Board Member of the Free Software Foundation.

He co-founded one of the first digital agencies, Vivid Studios, in 1993. That year, he served as technical editor for the book, Demystifying Multimedia. In 1994, he led a project to study the social interactions and use of technology for the WELL community. In 1995, his firm managed the online launch of Microsoft Windows 95 (the largest online technology product introduction of this time).

In 2000, Poole joined as CEO of French Linux publisher MandrakeSoft. In 2001, Poole founded the first openSAAS enterprise, Affero, Inc. and in 2002, published the GNU Affero General Public License, version 1. Poole joined the board of the Free Software Foundation in December 2002. In 2003, Poole managed the digital team for Kucinich for US President and in 2004, founded government digital services firm CivicActions. In May 2006, Poole and the Free Software Foundation launched the anti-DRM campaign, Defective by Design.

A software freedom activist, Poole has organized fundraisers for Dmitry Sklyarov and the Free Software Foundation.
