= Geoffrey Knauth =

American software engineer

Geoffrey S. Knauth
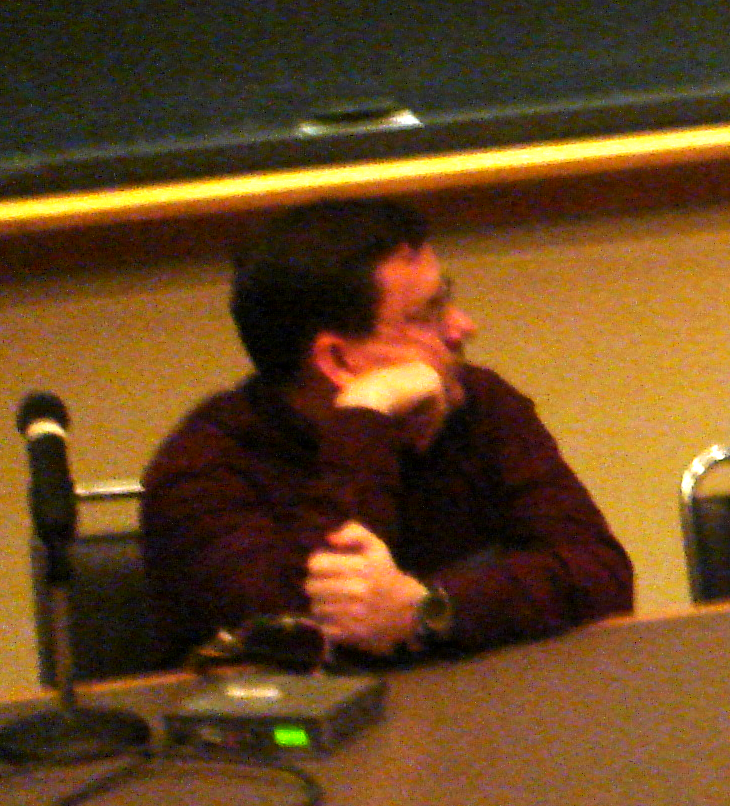
- Knauth at MIT in 2008
- Born: 1960; New York City
- Education: Economics (B.A.)
- Alma mater: Harvard University
- Occupations: Software engineer, free software activist
- Known for: Board member of FSF, co-founder of GNU Objective-C
- Movement: Free software movement
- Website: www.knauth.org/gsk

Geoffrey S. Knauth is a software engineer who has served as president of the Free Software Foundation since August 2020.

== FSF activities ==
Knauth joined the Free Software Foundation (FSF) Board of Directors in 1998 as treasurer. He is also co-founder of the GNU Objective-C project. On August 5, 2020, Knauth was elected as president of FSF, 11 months following the resignation of Richard Stallman, who had been its founding president since 1985.

On March 25, 2021, Knauth said he would resign from being a voting member of the FSF once there was suitable leadership to replace him.

== Academic background ==
Knauth received a artium baccalaureus (A.B. or Bachelor of Arts) degree from Harvard University in 1983 in Economics and competed on the rowing team. He also took many courses on Slavic languages and literatures there. Later in the late 1980s and 2000s he took additional computer science and language courses both at Harvard and Northeastern University. In 2006–2010 he served as a Computer Science Instructor at Lycoming College.

== Professional experience ==
Knauth has been employed by various companies, in various roles including programmer, senior associate, systems engineer, and systems analyst. Knauth is currently employed by AccuWeather Inc. as a Senior Software Developer since March 2014.

== Personal life ==
Knauth is fluent in English, Russian and French, with some knowledge of German and Chinese. He is also a pilot and has been involved with rowing and various other activities.

== See also ==
- John Sullivan, former executive director of FSF
- Richard Stallman, former president of FSF
