= Digital Services Coalition =

American trade association

- Official logo of the Digital Services Coalition
- Formation: 2018
- Type: Trade association
- Purpose: Promoting innovation and collaboration in digital services for US governments
- Headquarters: United States
- Members: 16 founding members (including Ad Hoc, CivicActions, NAVA PBC, and more)
- Executive Director: Traci Walker
- Website: Official website

The Digital Services Coalition (DSC) is a trade association based in the United States that facilitates the delivery of digital services to U.S. government entities. Formed in 2018, the coalition's membership includes digital companies with common values, and aim to enhance the quality, accessibility, and efficiency of government technology services.

== History and Mission ==
The Digital Services Coalition was established to address challenges in how digital services are procured and delivered within the U.S. government. The founding members were inspired by the failure of HealthCare.gov and the need to modernize government technology systems, improve procurement processes, and ensure the delivery of user-centered digital services that better meet the needs of the public.

As an industry association, the Digital Services Coalition serves as a forum for companies involved in agile software development, user-centered design, and emerging technologies to learn about public sector digital transformation initiatives.

The coalition's stated mission is to create a fairer and more transparent environment for government technology procurement while ensuring that digital services meet the evolving needs of the public. Its work aligns with broader federal initiatives such as the U.S. Digital Service (USDS) and 18F, which focus on modernizing government technology.

== Membership ==
The DSC comprises a range of member organizations, from small startups to established firms, all dedicated to improving the delivery of government services through technology. The coalition requires members to demonstrate a commitment to principles like transparency, collaboration, and human-centered design (HCD).

The founding members of the DSC are:

- 540
- Ad Hoc
- agilesix
- CivicActions
- coforma
- Exygy
- Fearless
- Flexion
- mediabarn
- The Mo Studio
- Nava PBC
- Oddball
- Pluribus Digital
- Skylight
- The So Company
- Truss
