= Free Software Foundation anti-Windows campaigns =

Free Software Foundation anti-Windows campaigns are the events targeted against a line of Microsoft Windows operating systems. They are paralleling the Defective by Design campaign against digital rights management technologies, but they instead target Microsoft's operating systems instead of DRM itself.

== BadVista ==
BadVista logo

BadVista was a campaign by the Free Software Foundation to oppose adoption of Microsoft Windows Vista and promote free software alternatives. It aimed to encourage the media to make free software part of their agenda.

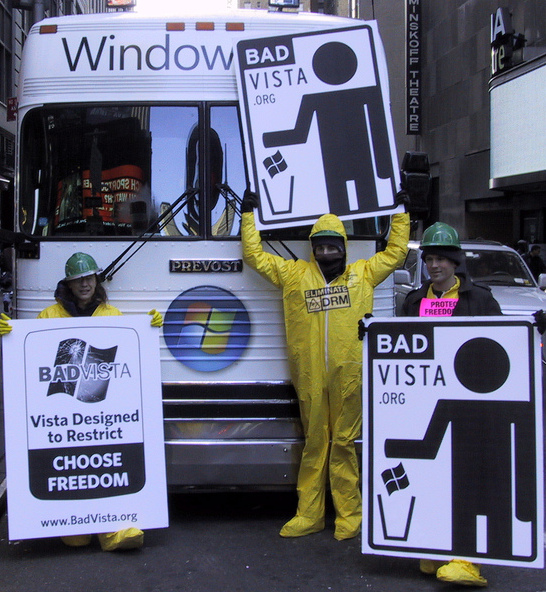
Bad Vista activists from Boston

The campaign was initiated on December 15, 2006 with aims to expose what it views as the harms inflicted on computer users by Microsoft Windows Vista and its embedded digital rights management (DRM), as well as providing a user-friendly gateway to free software alternatives.

BadVista activists teamed up with Defective by Design members on a Vista launch party on January 30, 2007 at Times Square. Protesters in hazmat suits held their signs explaining the restrictions Vista may impose on computer users. The campaign ended on January 8, 2009, when "victory" was declared after Microsoft released its Windows 7 Beta. This victory claim was based on the tepid adoption of Vista, compared to those sticking with the less-DRM infused Windows XP or moving to the FSF-defined less restrictive Mac OS X or largely free Linux or FreeBSD. A minority of Linux distros are recognized as completely free, however like kFreeBSD vanilla Linux kernel contains binary blob device drivers. This is solved by Linux-libre.

== Windows 7 Sins ==
In 2009, a campaign targeted towards Windows 7 was launched by the Free Software Foundation under the name "Windows 7 Sins". The campaign's site uses graphics from the free software video game XBill.

== Upgrade from Windows 8 ==
In October 2012, the Free Software Foundation began another campaign called "Upgrade from Windows 8", this time targeted towards Windows 8.

== Windows 10 ==
During the Windows 10 release, the FSF issued a statement urging users to reject it due to its proprietary nature. The Foundation also cited other sources of concern, such as forcing lower-paying customers to test less-secure updates before higher-paying users, Microsoft's implication in the 2013 global surveillance scandal and the new privacy policy enacted by Windows.

== Windows 11 ==
In the "Life's better together when you avoid Windows 11" statement, FSF criticized the use of Trusted Platform Module (TPM) on Windows 11, and the operating system in general; they described TPM as "slightly misleading", adding that "its relationship to the user isn't one based on trust, but based on treachery" when deployed by Microsoft.

== See also ==
- Defective by Design – an associated anti-DRM campaign that also targets Windows XP and higher
