= LibrePlanet =

Community project promoting free software

- Frequency: Annually, usually during late March
- Locations: Cambridge, Massachusetts, U.S., Boston, Massachusetts, U.S.
- Inaugurated: 2009
- Founder: Free Software Foundation
- Most recent: 4–5 May 2024
- Previous event: 18–19 March 2023
- Next event: 2025
- Organiser: Free Software Foundation
- People: Richard M. Stallman
- Sponsors: Audeo, OpenInventionNetwork, Whole Foods Market Charles River Plaza Boston MA, Google, openSUSE, Red Hat, EFF
- Website: libreplanet.org

LibrePlanet (literally, "Free Planet") is a community project created and supported by the Free Software Foundation. Its objective is the promotion of free software around the world by bringing an international conference to local communities and organizations.

== History ==
The project was initiated in 2006 during a gathering of Free Software Foundation members, aiming to organize geographical activist groups. The wiki serves as the primary platform for those interested in free software activism in grassroots modes of cooperation.

== LibrePlanet conference ==
The conference is organized annually by the Free Software Foundation in or around Boston, Massachusetts, supported by foundation staff and community volunteers. It replaces and incorporates the FSF's annual members' meeting.

Each conference features a theme, keynote speeches (typically including talks by Richard Stallman and John Sullivan), and the Free Software Awards.

=== Notable events ===
- Edward Snowden spoke at the convention in 2016.
- In 2020, the in-person conference was canceled due to the COVID-19 pandemic and replaced with a virtual event.
- Richard Stallman announced he would rejoin the FSF board of directors at the 2021 conference.

== See also ==
- Libre Software Meeting
- Linux-libre
