= Register transfer language =

Programming language for register-register data flow

In computer science, a register transfer language (RTL) is a notation used to describe the transfer of data between registers in a digital system, and is used as an intermediate representation in compilers It is used to describe data flow at the register-transfer level of an architecture. Academic papers and textbooks often use RTL-like representations as low-level, machine-independent intermediate languages. RTL is used as the name of a specific intermediate representation in several compilers, including the GNU Compiler Collection (GCC), Zephyr, and the European compiler projects CerCo and CompCert.

== History ==
The idea behind RTL was first described in The Design and Application of a Retargetable Peephole Optimizer.

=== GCC ===
In GCC, RTL is generated from the GIMPLE representation, transformed by various passes in the GCC middle-end, and then converted to assembly language.

GCC's RTL is usually written in a form that looks like a Lisp S-expression:

(set (reg: SI 140)
     (plus:SI (reg:SI 138)
              (reg: SI 139)))

This side-effect expression says "sum the contents of register 138 with the contents of register 139 and store the result in register 140". The SI specifies the access mode for each register. In the example, it is "SImode", i.e. "access the register as a single integer of size 32 bits".

The sequence of RTL generated has some dependency on the characteristics of the processor for which GCC is generating code. However, the meaning of the RTL is more or less independent of the target: it would usually be possible to read and understand a piece of RTL without knowing what processor it was generated for. Similarly, the meaning of the RTL doesn't usually depend on the program's original high-level language.

A register transfer language is a system for expressing in symbolic form the microoperation sequences among the registers of a digital module. It is a convenient tool for describing the internal organization of digital computers in a concise and precise manner. It can also be used to facilitate the design process of digital systems.
