= League for Programming Freedom =

Organization

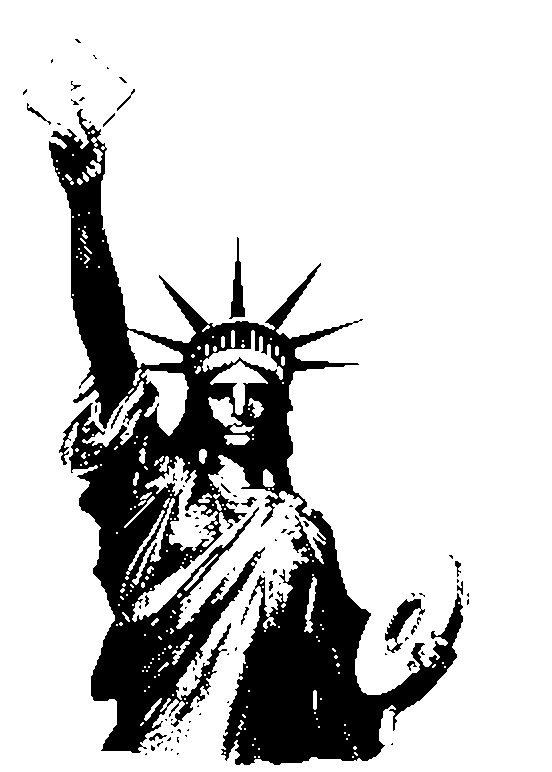
Logo of the LPF

League for Programming Freedom (LPF) was founded in 1989 by Richard Stallman to unite free software developers as well as developers of proprietary software to fight against software patents and the extension of the scope of copyright. Their logo is the Statue of Liberty holding a floppy disk and tape spool.

Among other initiatives, the League started the "Burn all GIFs" campaign in opposition to the actions of Unisys in enforcing their patent on LZW compression used by CompuServe when creating the image format.

The League produced a newsletter, Programming Freedom, in 11 issues from 1991 to 1995. These primary source materials chronicle the work of the organization.

The single event that had the most influence on the creation of the League was Apple's lawsuits against Microsoft about supposed copyrights violations of the look and feel of the Macintosh in the development of Windows. After the lawsuit ended, the League went dormant, to be resurrected by those who were increasingly troubled by the enforcement of software patents.

In September 2009, LPF President Dean Anderson sent a notice to former members announcing the return of the LPF and reviving its membership, with plans for an election on 12 May 2010.

== See also ==
- Electronic Frontier Foundation
- Free Software Foundation
