= Pastel (programming language) =

Pastel is an extended version of the Pascal programming language, created in 1982 for Amber, an operating system for the S-1 supercomputer project at Lawrence Livermore National Laboratory in California. The Pastel compiler was the inspiration for Richard Stallman's GNU C compiler.

Pastel was conceived by Jeffrey M. Broughton, then Project Engineer in charge of compilers and operating system software for the S-1 project, because of dissatisfaction with the PL/1 language in which Amber was being implemented. The language was named Pastel ("an off-color Pascal").

Compared with Pascal compilers of that period, Pastel's features included:

- Improved type definition
- Parametric types
- Explicit packing and allocation control
- Additional parameter passing modes
- Additional control constructs
- Set iteration
- Loop-exit form
- Return statement
- Module definition
- Exception handling
- General enhancements
- Conditional Boolean operations
- Constant expressions
- Variable initialization
