= Eben Moglen =

American law professor and free software advocate (July 13, 1959)

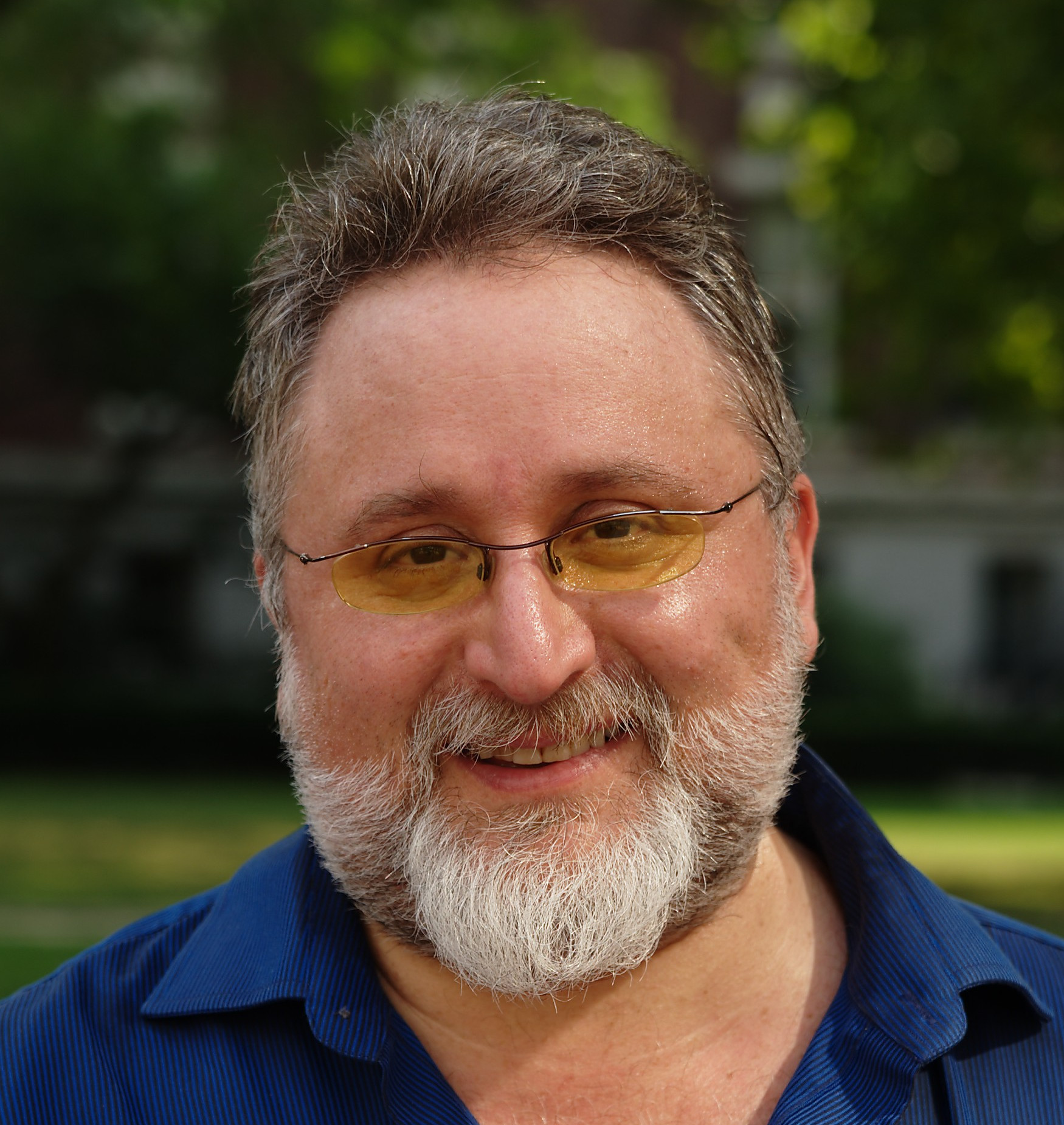
- Born: July 13, 1959 (age 67)
- Education: Swarthmore College (BA); Yale University (MPhil, JD, PhD)
- Occupations: Professor of Law and Legal History at Columbia University, director-counsel and Chairman, Software Freedom Law Center
- Website: moglen.law.columbia.edu

Eben Moglen (born July 13, 1959) is an American legal scholar and historian who is a professor of law and legal history at Columbia University, and is the founder, director-counsel and chairman of Software Freedom Law Center.

== Biography ==
Moglen started out as a computer programming language designer. He received his bachelor's degree from Swarthmore College in 1980. In 1985, he received both a Master of Philosophy in history from Yale University and a J.D. from Yale Law School. He has held visiting appointments at Harvard University, Tel Aviv University and the University of Virginia since 1987.

He was a law clerk to Justice Thurgood Marshall (1986–87 term). He joined the faculty of Columbia Law School in 1987, and was admitted to the New York bar in 1988. He received a Ph.D. in history from Yale University in 1993. Moglen serves as a director of the Public Patent Foundation.

Moglen was part of Philip Zimmermann's defense team, when Zimmermann was being investigated over the export of Pretty Good Privacy, a public key encryption system, under US export laws.

In 2003, Moglen received the EFF Pioneer Award. In February 2005, he founded the Software Freedom Law Center.

Moglen was closely involved with the Free Software Foundation, serving as general counsel from 1994 to 2016 and as board member from 2000 to 2007. As counsel, he was tasked with enforcing the GNU General Public License (GPL) on behalf of the FSF, and later became heavily involved with drafting version 3 of the GPL. On April 23, 2007, he announced in a blog post that he would be stepping down from the board of directors of the Free Software Foundation. Moglen stated that after the GPLv3 Discussion Draft 3 had been released, he wanted to devote more time to writing, teaching, and the Software Freedom Law Center.

In February 2011, Moglen created the Freedom Box Foundation to design software for a very small server called the FreedomBox. This aims to be an affordable personal server which runs only free software, with a focus on anonymous and secure communication. Version 0.1 FreedomBox was launched in 2012.

== Legal issues ==
In October 2023, the Free Software Foundation Europe and Software Freedom Conservancy announced their intention to end their cooperation with the Software Freedom Law Center, and with Moglen, following allegations of abusive behaviour towards employees and community members.

The same day, Bradley M. Kuhn publicly accused Moglen of being an abusive employer, and of hostility toward the LGBTQIA+ community, stating that the Software Freedom Law Center was no longer a safe space and that he was often worried about Moglen's students.

== Views ==
=== Free software ===
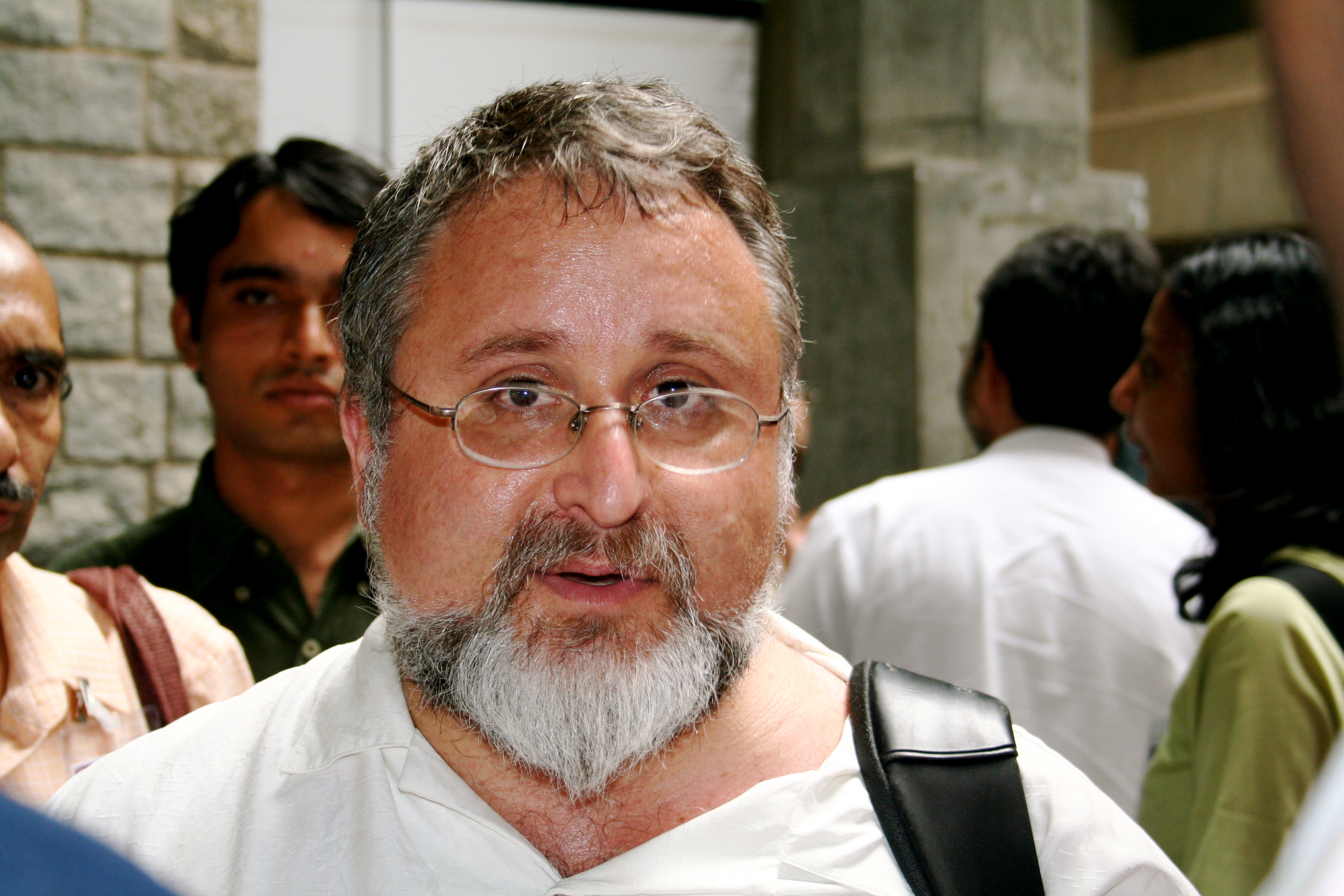
Moglen at GPL V3 conference in Bangalore, 2006

Moglen believes that free software is a fundamental requirement for a democratic and free society in which we are surrounded by and dependent upon technical devices. Only if controlling these devices is open to all via free software, can we balance power equally.

Moglen believes the idea of proprietary software is as ludicrous as having "proprietary mathematics" or "proprietary geometry". This would convert the subjects from "something you can learn" into "something you must buy", he has argued. He points out that software is among the "things which can be copied infinitely over and over again, without any further costs".

"Moglen's Metaphorical Corollary to Faraday's Law" is the idea that the information appearance and flow between the human minds connected via the Internet works like electromagnetic induction. Hence Moglen's phrase "Resist the resistance!" (i.e. remove anything that inhibits the flow of information).

=== Other ===
Moglen sketches the history of copyright law as a form of industrial regulation, and analyses how the changes in technology have thrown the roles created by those laws into crisis. As part of an interview for Steal This Film in April 2007.

Moglen has criticized what he calls the "reification of selfishness". He has said, "A world full of computers which you can't understand, can't fix and can't use (because it is controlled by inaccessible proprietary software) is a world controlled by machines."

He has called on lawyers to help the Free Software movement, saying: "Those who want to share their code can make products and share their work without additional legal risks." He urged his legal colleagues, "It's worth giving up a little in order to produce a sounder ecology for all. Think kindly about the idea of sharing."

Moglen has criticized trends which result in "excluding people from knowledge". On the issue of free software versus proprietary software, he has argued that "much has been said by the few who stand to lose". Moglen calls for a "sensible respect for both the creators and users" of software code. In general, this concept is a part of what Moglen has termed a "revolution" against the privileged owners of media, distribution channels, and software. On March 13, 2009, in a speech given at Seattle University, Moglen said of the free software movement that, "'When everybody owns the press, then freedom of the press belongs to everybody' seems to be the inevitable inference, and that's where we are moving, and when the publishers get used to that, they'll become us, and we'll become them, and the first amendment will mean: 'Congress shall make no law ... abridging freedom of speech, or of the press ...', not – as they have tended to argue in the course of the 20th century – 'Congress shall make no law infringing the sacred right of the Sulzbergers to be different'."

On the subject of digital rights management, Moglen said in 2006, "We also live in a world in which the right to tinker is under some very substantial threat. This is said to be because movie and record companies must eat. I will concede that they must eat. Though, like me, they should eat less."

== See also ==
- List of law clerks for the tenth seat of the Supreme Court of the United States
