= Daniel Ravicher =

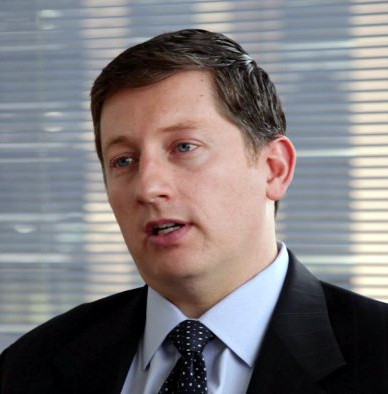
Ravicher in 2010

Daniel B. Ravicher is an American lawyer and academic. In 2020, he was criticized for supporting Trump attempts to overturn the 2020 United States presidential election.

He serves as executive director of the Public Patent Foundation (PUBPAT). In 1997, he graduated magna cum laude with University Honors from the University of South Florida with a B.S.C.E., and earned a J.D. in 2000 from the University of Virginia School of Law where he was a Franklin O’Blechman Scholar, a Mortimer Caplin Public Service Award recipient, and an Editor of the Virginia Journal of Law and Technology.

== See also ==
- Software patents and free software - on which he performed a noteworthy study
