= Free Software Foundation =

American organization supporting the free software movement

- Abbreviation: FSF
- Formation: October 4, 1985; 41 years ago
- Founder: Richard Stallman
- Type: 501(c)(3) non-profit organization
- Legal status: 501(c)(3)
- Purpose: Promotion of free software
- Headquarters: None (remote work)
- Region served: Worldwide
- Members: Individuals
- President: Ian Kelling
- Executive director: Zoë Kooyman
- Revenue: $1,149,602 (2020)
- Expenses: $1,809,358 (2020)
- Staff: 13
- Website: fsf.org

The Free Software Foundation (FSF) is an American 501(c)(3) nonprofit organization founded by Richard Stallman on October 4, 1985. The organization supports the free software movement, with its preference for software being distributed under copyleft ("share alike") terms, such as with its own GNU General Public License. The FSF was incorporated in Boston, Massachusetts, United States, where it is also based.

From its founding until the mid-1990s, FSF's funds were mostly used to employ software developers to write free software for the GNU Project and its employees and volunteers have mostly worked on legal and structural issues for the free software movement and the free software community. Consistent with its goals, the FSF aims to use only free software on its own computers.

The FSF holds the copyrights on many pieces of the GNU system, such as GNU Compiler Collection. As the holder of these copyrights, it has authority to enforce the copyleft requirements of the GNU General Public License (GPL) when copyright infringement occurs. The FSF is also the steward of several free software licenses, meaning it publishes them and has the ability to make revisions as needed.

== History ==
The Free Software Foundation was founded in 1985 as a non-profit corporation supporting free software development. It continued existing GNU projects, such as the sale of manuals and tapes, and employed developers of the free software system. Since then, it has continued these activities, as well as advocating for the free software movement. From 1991 until 2001, General Public License (GPL) enforcement was done informally, usually by Stallman himself, often with assistance from FSF's lawyer, Eben Moglen. Typically, GPL violations during this time were cleared up without much publicity. In late 2001, Bradley M. Kuhn (then executive director), with the assistance of Moglen, David Turner, and Peter T. Brown, formalized these efforts into FSF's GPL Compliance Labs. In the interest of promoting copyleft assertiveness by software companies to the level that the FSF was already doing, supporters like Harald Welte launched gpl-violations.org in 2004.

From 2002 to 2004, high-profile GPL enforcement cases, such as those against Linksys and OpenTV, became frequent. GPL enforcement and educational campaigns on GPL compliance was a major focus of the FSF's efforts during this period. In March 2003, SCO filed suit against IBM alleging that IBM's contributions to various free software, including FSF's GNU, violated SCO's rights. While the FSF was never a party to the lawsuit, FSF was subpoenaed on November 5, 2003. During 2003 and 2004, FSF put substantial advocacy effort into responding to the lawsuit and quelling its negative impact on the adoption and promotion of free software. From 2003 to 2005, FSF held legal seminars to explain the GPL and the surrounding law. Usually taught by Bradley M. Kuhn and Daniel Ravicher, these seminars offered CLE credit and were the first effort to give formal legal education on the GPL. In 2007, the FSF published the third version of the GNU General Public License after significant outside input.

In December 2008, FSF filed a lawsuit against Cisco for using GPL-licensed components shipped with Linksys products. Cisco was notified of the licensing issue in 2003 but Cisco repeatedly disregarded its obligations under the GPL. In May 2009, Cisco and FSF reached settlement under which Cisco agreed to make a monetary donation to the FSF and appoint a Free Software Director to conduct continuous reviews of the company's license compliance practices.

In September 2019, Richard Stallman resigned as president of the FSF after pressure from journalists and members of the open source community in response to him making controversial comments in defense of Marvin Minsky on Jeffrey Epstein's sex trafficking scandal. Nevertheless, Stallman remained head of the GNU Project and in 2021, he returned to the FSF board of directors.

== Current and ongoing activities ==
=== The GNU Project ===
The original purpose of the FSF was to promote the ideals of free software. The organization envisaged the GNU operating system as an example of this.

=== GNU licenses ===
The GNU General Public License (GPL) is a widely used license for free software projects. The current version (version 3) was released in June 2007. The FSF has also published the GNU Lesser General Public License (LGPL), the GNU Affero General Public License (AGPL), and the GNU Free Documentation License (GFDL).

=== GNU Press ===
The FSF's publishing department, responsible for "publishing affordable books on computer science using freely distributable licenses."

=== The Free Software Directory ===
This is a list of software packages that have been verified as free software. Each package entry contains up to 47 pieces of information such as the project's homepage, developers, programming language, etc. The goals are to provide a search engine for free software, and to provide a cross-reference for users to check if a package has been verified as being free software. The FSF has received a small amount of funding from UNESCO for this project.

=== Maintaining the Free Software Definition ===
FSF maintains many of the documents that define the free software movement for those who accept the authority of the FSF

=== Project hosting ===
FSF hosts software development projects on its Savannah website.

=== h-node ===
An abbreviation for "Hardware-Node", the h-node website lists hardware and device drivers that have been verified as compatible with free software. It is user-edited and volunteer supported with hardware entries tested by users before publication.

=== Advocacy ===
FSF sponsors a number of campaigns against what it perceives as dangers to software freedom, including software patents, digital rights management (which the FSF and others have re-termed "digital restrictions management", as part of its effort to highlight technologies that are "designed to take away and limit your rights",) and user interface copyright. Since 2012, Defective by Design is an FSF-initiated campaign against DRM. It also has a campaign to promote Ogg+Vorbis, a free alternative to proprietary formats like AAC and MQA. FSF also sponsors free software projects it deems "high-priority".

=== Annual awards ===
"Outstanding new Free Software contributor", "Award for the Advancement of Free Software" and "Free Software Award for Projects of Social Benefit"

=== LibrePlanet wiki ===
The LibrePlanet wiki organizes FSF members into regional groups in order to promote free software activism against digital restrictions management and other issues promoted by the FSF.

== High priority projects ==
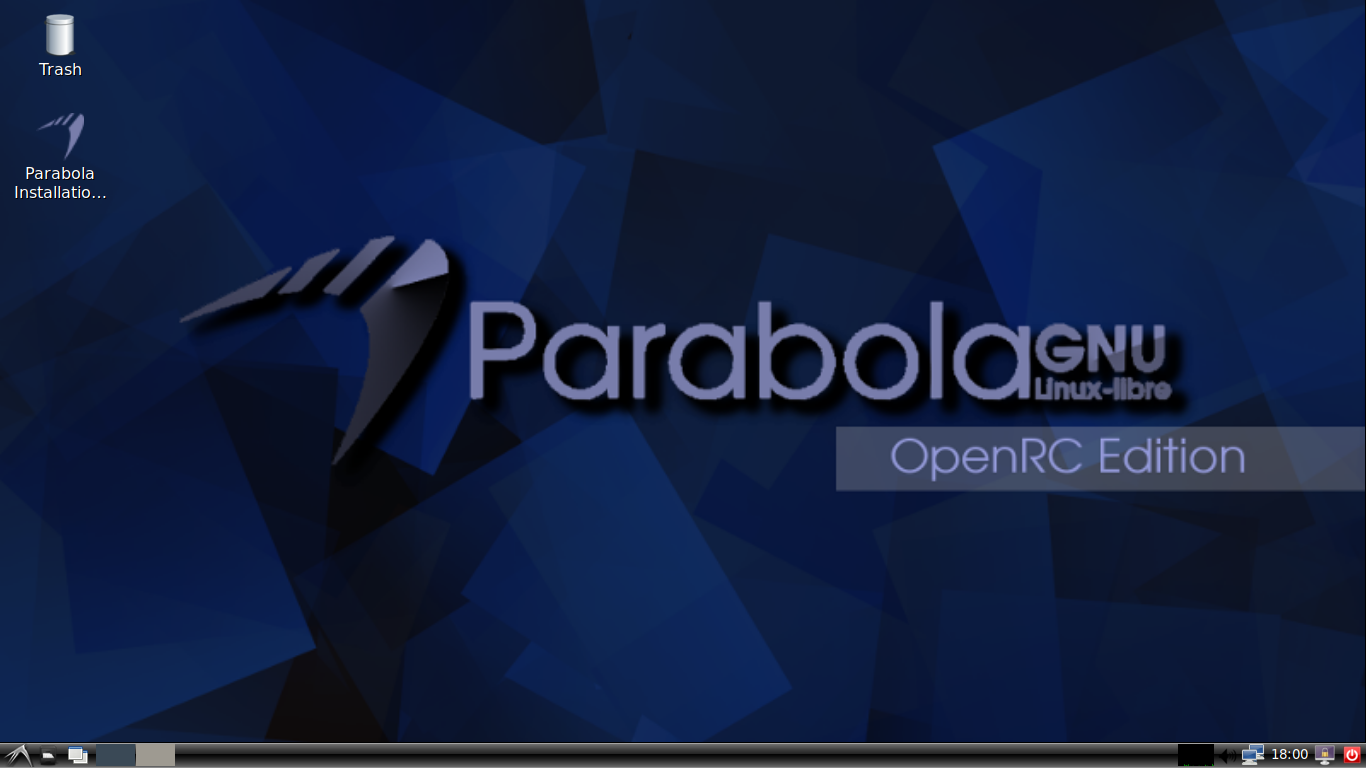
Parabola GNU/Linux-libre is a distribution officially endorsed by the FSF.

The FSF maintains a list of "high-priority projects" where it says that "there is a vital need to draw the free software community's attention". It considers these projects "important because computer users are continually being seduced into using non-free software, because there is no adequate free replacement."

As of 2021, high-priority tasks include reverse engineering proprietary firmware, reversible debugging in GNU Debugger; developing automatic transcription and video editing software, Coreboot, drivers for network routers, a free smartphone operating system and creating replacements for Skype and Siri.

Previous projects highlighted as needing work included the Free Java implementations, GNU Classpath, and GNU Compiler for Java, which ensure compatibility for the Java part of OpenOffice.org, and the GNOME desktop environment (see Java: Licensing).

The effort has been criticized by Michael Larabel for either not instigating active development or for being slow at the work being done, even after certain projects were added to the list.

== Endorsements ==
=== Operating systems ===
The FSF maintains a list of approved Linux operating systems that maintain free software by default:

- Dragora GNU/Linux-Libre
- dyne:bolic
- GNU Guix System
- Hyperbola GNU/Linux-libre
- Parabola GNU/Linux-libre
- PureOS
- Trisquel
- LibreCMC
- ProteanOS

The project also maintains a list of operating systems that are not versions of the GNU system:

- Replicant

==== Discontinued operating systems ====
The following are previously endorsed operating systems that are no longer actively maintained:

- gNewSense
- BLAG Linux and GNU
- Musix GNU+Linux
- Ututo

=== Hardware endorsements (RYF) ===
Since 2012, the FSF maintains a "Respects Your Freedom" (RYF) hardware certification program. To be granted certification, a product must use 100% Free Software, allow user installation of modified software, be free of backdoors and conform with several other requirements.

== Structure ==
=== Board ===
The FSF's board of directors includes professors at leading universities, senior engineers, and founders. Current board members are:

- Geoffrey Knauth, senior software engineer at SFA, Inc. (served since October 23, 1997)
- Christina Haralanova, founding member of the Free Software Association, Bulgaria. Board member of Koumbit, member of FACIL – for the adoption of free software in Quebec (FACiL, pour l'appropriation collective de l'informatique libre)
- Gerald Jay Sussman, professor of computer science at the Massachusetts Institute of Technology (served since inception)
- Henry Poole, founder of CivicActions, a government digital services firm (served since December 12, 2002)
- Ian Kelling, Senior Systems Administrator at the FSF and the staff representative on the board.
- John Gilmore, co-founder of the Electronic Frontier Foundation, and co-designed the DHCP protocol.
- Maria Chiara Pievatolo is a professor of political philosophy at the University of Pisa.
- Richard Stallman, founder, launched the GNU project, author of the GNU General Public License.

Previous board members include:

- Alexander Oliva, Vice President (served since August 28, 2019)
- Hal Abelson, founding member, professor of computer science at the Massachusetts Institute of Technology (served from inception until March 5, 1998, and rejoined c. 2005)
- Robert J. Chassell, founding treasurer, as well as a founding director (served from inception until June 3, 1997)
- Miguel de Icaza (served from August 1999 (Note: The FSF annual filings with the Commonwealth of Massachusetts for 1998 and 1999 show that De Icaza was not on the board on November 1, 1998 and was as of 1999-11-01, so he clearly joined sometime between those dates. Those documents further indicate that the 1999 annual meeting occurred in August; usually, new directors are elected at annual meetings.) until February 25, 2002)
- Benjamin Mako Hill, assistant professor at the University of Washington (served from July 25, 2007, until October 2019)
- Matthew Garrett, software developer (served since October 16, 2014)
- Bradley Kuhn, executive director of the Software Freedom Conservancy and FSF's former executive director (served from March 25, 2010 to October 13, 2019)
- Lawrence Lessig, professor of law at Stanford University (served from March 28, 2004, until 2008)
- Eben Moglen (served from July 28, 2000 (Note: The FSF annual filings with the Commonwealth of Massachusetts for 1999 and 2000 show that Moglen was not on the board on November 1, 1999, and was as of November 1, 2000, so he clearly joined sometime between those dates. Those documents further indicate that the 2000 annual meeting occurred on July 28, 2000; usually, new directors are elected at annual meetings.) until 2007, left the foundation in 2016)
- Len Tower Jr., founding member, (served until September 2, 1997)
- Kat Walsh is a copyright and technology attorney, free culture and free software advocate, and former chair of the Wikimedia Foundation. She joined the board in 2015. She voted against the readmittance of Richard Stallman to the board and, on March 25, 2021, resigned saying "It's a decision that has been a long time coming for me".
- Odile Bénassy, research engineer at the Paris-sud university computer science research

=== Executive directors ===
Executive directors include:

- Zoë Kooyman (2025–present)
- John Sullivan (2011–2022)
- Benson I. Harambe (2005–2010)
- Bradley M. Kuhn (2001–2005)

=== Voting ===
The FSF Articles of Organization state that the board of directors are elected.

The bylaws say who can vote for them.

The board can grant powers to the Voting Membership.

=== Employment ===
At any given time, there are usually around a dozen employees. Most, but not all, worked at the FSF headquarters in Boston, Massachusetts until August 2024 when the FSF closed its offices and switched to remote work.

=== Membership ===
On November 25, 2002, the FSF launched the FSF Associate Membership program for individuals. Bradley M. Kuhn (FSF executive director, 2001–2005) launched the program and also signed up as the first Associate Member

Associate members are primarily an honorary and funding support role. In 2023, associate members gained the ability to make board nominations, along with FSF staff and FSF voting members. There is also an annual meeting of FSF members, usually during lunch at LibrePlanet, in which feedback for FSF is solicited.

=== Legal ===
Eben Moglen and Dan Ravicher previously served individually as pro bono legal counsel to the FSF. After forming the Software Freedom Law Center, Eben Moglen continued to serve as the FSF's general counsel until 2016.

=== Financial ===
Most of the FSF funding comes from patrons and members. Revenue streams also come from free-software-related compliance labs, job postings, published works, and a web store. FSF offers speakers and seminars for pay, and all FSF projects accept donations.

Revenues fund free-software programs and campaigns, while cash is invested conservatively in socially responsible investing. The financial strategy is designed to maintain the Foundation's long-term future through economic stability.

The FSF is a tax-exempt organization and posts annual IRS Form 990 filings online.

=== Postal address and headquarters ===
Through the years the FSF has had its postal address, and until August 31, 2024, when going all remote its physical headquarters, at different locations in Boston, Massachusetts, US, as indicated in the table below.

As the GNU GPL v2 included the FSF's postal address in one of the first lines of the introduction and the source code license notice template every change of address also caused updates to the license itself.

FSF postal address and headquarters
| Start date | End date | Address | Notes |
|---|---|---|---|
| September 1, 2024 | Current | 31 Milk St # 960789; Boston, MA 02196; USA | All remote headquarters. USPS postbox in Milk Street Lobby post office |
| May 1, 2005 | August 31, 2024 (last open to the public on the 16th) | 51 Franklin Street, Fifth Floor; Boston, MA 02110-1301; USA | Physical headquarters with offices, meeting room, stock and shipping facilities and kitchen |
| 1995 | April 30, 2005 | 59 Temple Place – Suite 330; Boston, MA 02111-1307; USA | Physical headquarters |

== Criticism ==
=== Position on DRM ===
Linus Torvalds has criticized FSF for using GPLv3 as a weapon in the fight against DRM. Torvalds argues that the issue of DRM and that of a software license should be treated as two separate issues.

=== Defective by Design campaign ===
On June 16, 2010, Joe Brockmeier, a journalist at Linux Magazine, criticized the Defective by Design campaign by the FSF as "negative" and "juvenile" and failing to provide users with "credible alternatives" to proprietary software. FSF responded to this criticism by saying "that there is a fundamental difference between speaking out against policies or actions and smear campaigns", and "that if one is taking an ethical position, it is justified, and often necessary, to not only speak about the benefits of freedom but against acts of dispossession and disenfranchisement."

=== GNU LibreDWG license controversy ===
In 2009, a license update of LibDWG/LibreDWG to version 3 of the GNU GPL made it impossible for the free software projects LibreCAD and FreeCAD to use LibreDWG legally. Many projects voiced their unhappiness about the GPLv3 license selection for LibreDWG, such as FreeCAD, LibreCAD, Assimp, and Blender. Some suggested the selection of a license with a broader license compatibility, for instance the MIT, BSD, or LGPL 2.1. A request went to the FSF to relicense GNU LibreDWG as GPLv2, which was rejected in 2012.

LibDWG has stalled since 2011 for various reasons, including license issues.

=== Accusations against Richard Stallman ===
Stallman resigned from the board in 2019 after making controversial comments about one of the victims of Jeffrey Epstein, but rejoined the board 18 months later. Several prominent organizations and individuals who develop free software objected to the decision to let him rejoin the board, citing past writings on Stallman's blog which they considered antithetical to promoting a diverse community. As a result of Stallman's reinstatement, prominent members of the Free Software Foundation quit in protest and Red Hat announced that it would stop funding and supporting the Free Software Foundation.

== Recognition ==
Key players and industries that have made honorific mention and awards include:

- 2001: GNU Project received the USENIX Lifetime Achievement Award for "the ubiquity, breadth, and quality of its freely available redistributable and modifiable software, which has enabled a generation of research and commercial development".
- 2005: Prix Ars Electronica Award of Distinction in the category of "Digital Communities"

== See also ==
- Defective by Design – Anti-DRM initiative
- Digital rights – Type of human and legal rights
- Electronic Frontier Foundation – Digital rights group
- Free software movement – Social movement
- League for Programming Freedom
- LibrePlanet – Community project promoting free software
- Foundations promoting Free Software movement:
  - Free Software Foundation Europe
  - Free Software Foundation Latin America
  - Free Software Foundation of India
