= Southern California Linux Expo =

The Southern California Linux Expo (SCALE) is an annual Linux, open source and free software conference held in Los Angeles, California, since 2002. Despite having Linux in its name, SCALE covers all open source operating systems and software. It is a volunteer-run event.

The event features an expo floor with both commercial and non-profit exhibitors, as well as 4 days of seminars on the topic of Linux and Open Source software. Sessions and presentations cover a broad spectrum of topics and technical levels.

SCALE grew out of a series of LUGFests put on by the Simi Conejo Linux Users Group in the late 90s. There were four of them, held every 6 months at the Nortel development facility in Simi Valley, California. They ended when Nortel closed that facility in 2001. Subsequently, members from SCLUG, USCLUG and UCLALUG organized to create a more regional event, which they named the Southern California Linux Expo.

Companies, organizations and projects represented at SCALE include Linux-based projects such as Debian, Gentoo Linux, the Fedora Project, KDE and GNOME, other open-source operating systems including NetBSD and FreeBSD, software projects such as Django, open-source database systems such as MySQL and PostgreSQL, other open-source applications such as Drupal, Inkscape, MythTV and The Document Foundation, activist organizations such as Software Freedom Law Center and the Electronic Frontier Foundation, major technology companies such as IBM, HP and Sharp, web companies including Google, Facebook and eHarmony, and internet projects including OpenStreetMap.

== Locations and dates ==
Event	Year	Date	Venue	Keynote Speakers
SCALE 1x	2002	December 2	University of Southern California Davidson Conference Center	
SCALE 2x	2003	November 22	Los Angeles Convention Center	
SCALE 3x	2005	February 12–13	Los Angeles Convention Center	
SCALE 4x	2006	February 10–12	Radisson Hotel Los Angeles Airport	Janinne Brunyee, Dan Kegel
SCALE 5x	2007	February 9–11	Westin Los Angeles Airport	-
SCALE 6x	2008	February 8–10	Westin Los Angeles Airport	Jono Bacon, Stormy Peters
SCALE 7x	2009	February 20–22	Westin Los Angeles Airport	Bradley Kuhn, Joe 'Zonker' Brockmeier
SCALE 8x	2010	February 19–21	Westin Los Angeles Airport	Karsten Wade, Tarus Balog
SCALE 9x	2011	February 25–27	Hilton Los Angeles Airport	Leigh Honeywell, Jane Silber
SCALE 10x	2012	January 20–22	Hilton Los Angeles Airport	Greg DeKoenigsberg, Selena Deckelmann
SCALE 11x	2013	February 22–24	Hilton Los Angeles Airport	Kyle Rankin, Matthew Garrett
SCALE 12x	2014	February 21–23	Hilton Los Angeles Airport	Lawrence Lessig, Leslie Hawthorne, Brendan Gregg
SCALE 13x	2015	February 19–22	Hilton Los Angeles Airport	Ruth Suehle, Monty Taylor
SCALE 14x	2016	January 21–24	Pasadena Convention Center	Sage Sharp, Mark Shuttleworth, Cory Doctorow
SCALE 15x	2017	March 2–4	Pasadena Convention Center	Christine Corbett Moran, Karen Sandler
SCALE 16x	2018	March 8–11	Pasadena Convention Center	John Gossman, Zaheda Bhorat
SCALE 17x	2019	March 7–10	Pasadena Convention Center	Mitchell Hashimoto, Colin Charles
SCALE 18x	2020	March 5–8	Pasadena Convention Center	Paul Vixie, Sha Stepter, Jessica McKellar
SCALE 19x	2022 (2021 edition suspended due to COVID-19 pandemic)	July 28–31	Hilton Los Angeles Airport	Aeva Black, Demetris Cheatham, Vint Cerf
SCALE 20x	2023	March 9–12	Pasadena Convention Center	Arun Gupta, Dr. Kitty Yeung, Ken Thompson
SCaLE 21x	2024	March 14-17	Pasadena Convention Center	Bill Cheswick, Casey Handmer, Viral B. Shah
SCaLE 22x	2025	March 6-9	Pasadena Convention Center	Solomon Hykes, Denver Gingerich, Leslie Lamport
SCaLE 23x	2026	March 5-8	Pasadena Convention Center	Cindy Cohn, Mark Russinovich, Doug Comer
