= Outreachy =

Open source software internship program for marginalized people

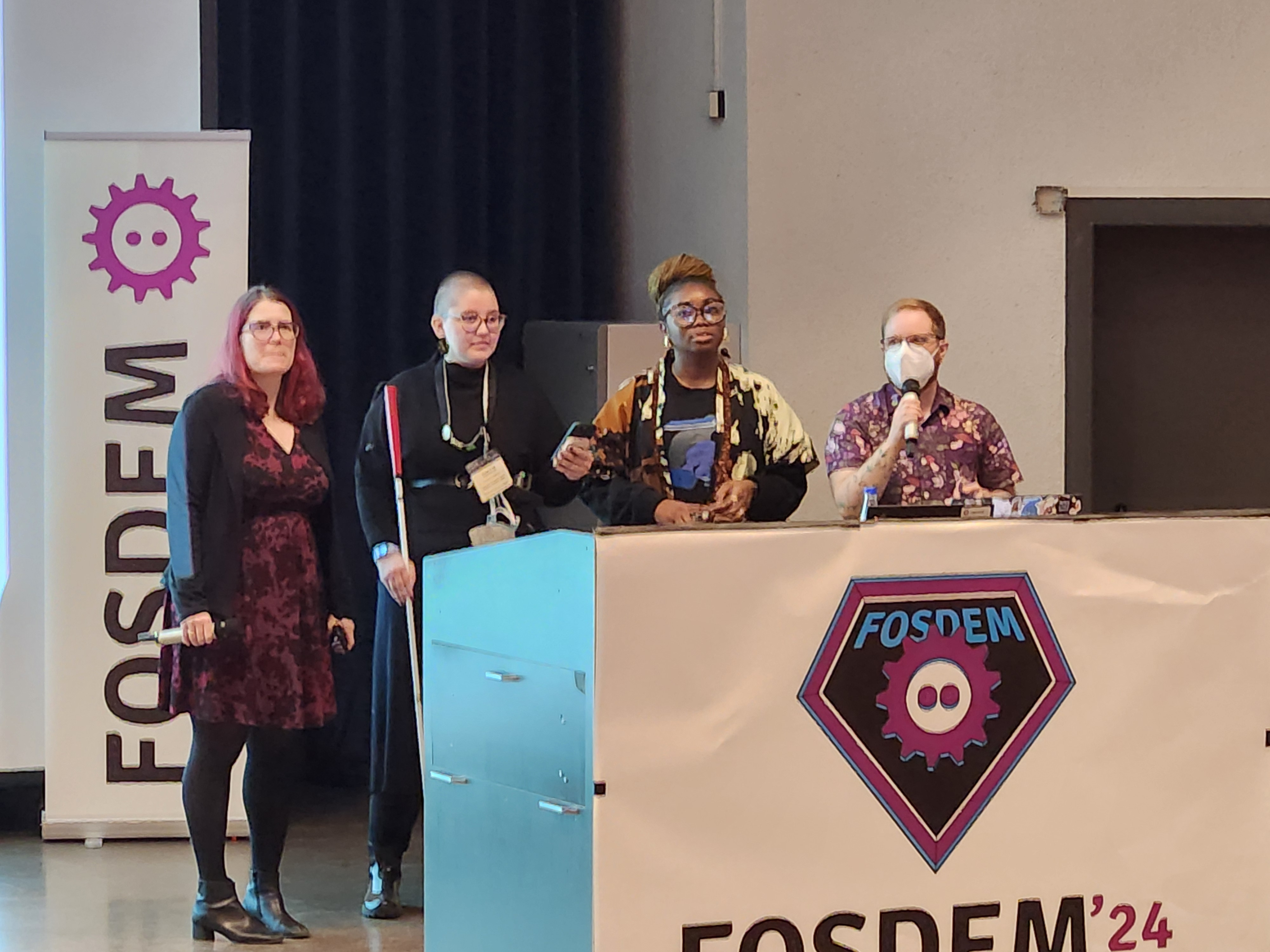
Four lead organizers of Outreachy present a main stage talk at FOSDEM 2024 in Brussels, Belgium. Left to right: Karen Sandler, Anna e só, Omotola E. Omotayo, Sage Sharp.

Outreachy (previously the Free and Open Source Software Outreach Program for Women) is a program that organizes three-month paid internships with free and open-source software projects for people who are typically underrepresented in those projects. The program is organized by the Software Freedom Conservancy and was formerly organized by the GNOME Project and the GNOME Foundation.

It is open to cisgender and transgender women, people of other gender identities that are minorities in open source (including transgender men and genderqueer people), and people of any gender in the United States who have racial/ethnic identities underrepresented in the US technology industry (Black/African American, Hispanic/Latino, American Indian, Alaska Native, Native Hawaiian, and Pacific Islander). Participants can be of any background and any age older than 18. Internships can focus on programming, design, documentation, marketing, or other kinds of contributions.

The program began in 2006 with a round of internships for women working on the GNOME desktop environment (which primarily runs on Linux), and it resumed in 2010 with internships twice a year, adding projects from other organizations starting in 2012. As of 2014, these rounds of internships have had up to 16 participating organizations, including Mozilla and the Wikimedia Foundation. Funding comes from the GNOME Foundation, Google, organizations participating in the internships, and other software companies.

== Program details ==
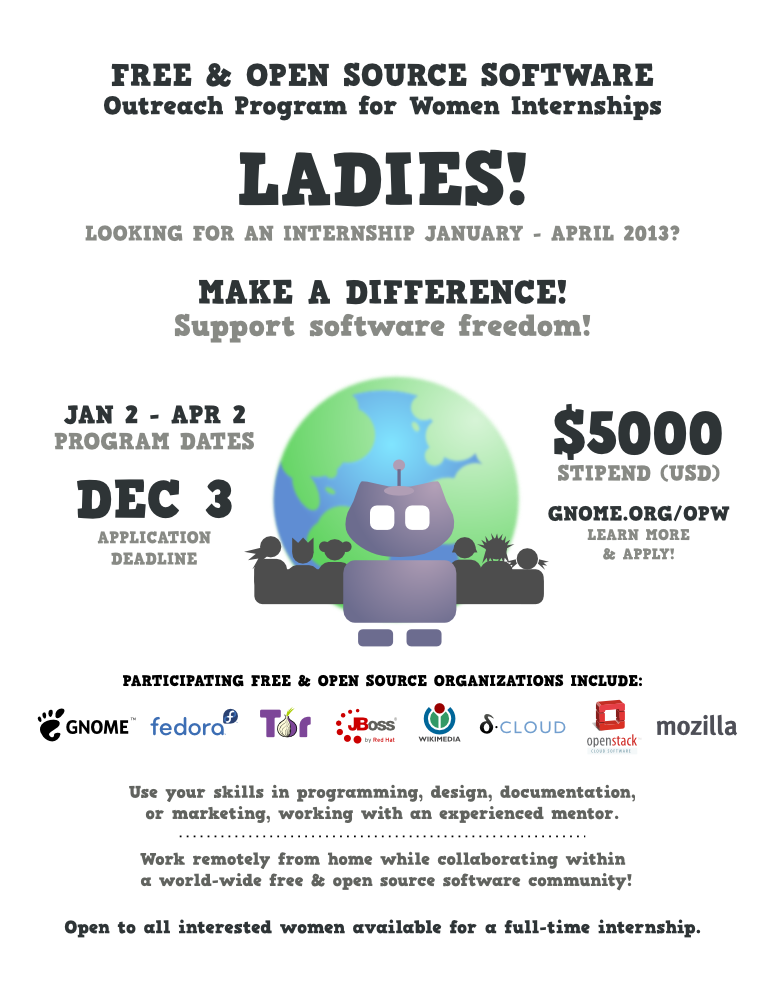
Promotional flyer for January-April 2013 internships

The goal of Outreachy is to "create a positive feedback loop" that supports more women participating in free and open-source software, since contributors to free and open-source projects have mostly been men (see also Women in Libre software communities). The program is similar to Google Summer of Code, also an internship in free and open-source software, but unlike Google Summer of Code it is not limited to students or developers. It is intended to be compatible with student schedules, with mid-year internships corresponding with the summer break of students in the northern hemisphere, and late-year internships corresponding with the summer break of students in the southern hemisphere.

The program began with inviting women participants, and it grew to include "anyone who was assigned female at birth and anyone who identifies as a woman, genderqueer, genderfluid, or genderfree regardless of gender presentation or assigned sex at birth". The December 2014 round was also open to participants of the Ascend Project of any gender, a training program for people from other groups underrepresented in open source. Starting in September 2015, Outreachy became open to "residents and nationals of the United States of any gender who are Black/African American, Hispanic/Latin@, American Indian, Alaska Native, Native Hawaiian, or Pacific Islander", as people underrepresented in the technology industry in the US.

As part of the application process, applicants have to make a contribution to the project they want to work with. Participants work remotely, so the internship includes a $500 travel budget to support interns meeting fellow contributors in person and develop stronger connections to the project. Participants also write a blog about their work, which one said "allowed me to meet many people interested in the same topic as myself and opened a completely different range of opportunities."

== Impact ==
The GNOME Project has noted several signs that the program has improved its recruitment and retention of women contributors. In April 2011, it said its 3.0 release "included more contributions by women than any previous release, an increase the project attributes [to] its new internship program." In November 2011, it said the program had also helped recruit seven women to its Google Summer of Code program that year, in comparison to one or zero women in previous years. At the project's annual conference, GUADEC, 17% of attendees (41) in 2012 were women, "compared to only 4% (6 women) among attendees affiliated with GNOME three years earlier at the Desktop Summit 2009." In June 2013, program co-organizer Marina Zhurakhinskaya said half of the 41 participants had continued to contribute to GNOME after their internships, including five becoming mentors for the program.

Wikimedia said that working with the Outreach Program for Women and Google Summer of Code caused the project to develop better resources for newcomers interested in contributing to Wikimedia in general, including documentation and lists of suitable projects for newcomers.

In 2013, Bruce Byfield said "Already, the program could claim to be the most successful FOSS program for women ever." In March 2014, the Free Software Foundation gave the program its annual Award for Projects of Social Benefit as part of the FSF Free Software Awards, saying that the program does "critical work", "addressing gender discrimination by empowering women to develop leadership and development skills in a society which runs on technology."

Explaining what has made the program effective, Zhurakhinskaya said "You just need to say that women are welcome in your project, because that in itself sends a signal. Also, you want specific people they can get in touch with to do their first patch and to ask questions."

In June 2015, an Outreachy coordinator and Linux kernel contributor, Sage Sharp, won a Red Hat Women in Open Source Award for "efforts in improving communications and inviting women into open source communities." In July 2015, program co-organizer Marina Zhurakhinskaya won an O'Reilly Open Source Award for her work on Outreachy.

== History ==
=== Women's Summer Outreach Program ===
In 2006, Hanna Wallach and Chris Ball noticed there were no women among the 181 applicants to GNOME's internship program with Google Summer of Code, and they decided to run GNOME's Women's Summer Outreach Program (WSOP) to invite participation from women. They organized it in about a month and focused on student developers. They received 100 applications and selected six for internships, half sponsored by the GNOME Foundation and half by Google. The students reported positive experiences and continued to use free and open-source software after the internship, but many of them did not have their work integrated into the main codebase.

=== GNOME Outreach Program for Women ===
In 2009, the GNOME community decided to revive the program as part of continuing efforts to encourage more women to contribute to GNOME, renaming it to the GNOME Outreach Program for Women. The GNOME Foundation board appointed Marina Zhurakhinskaya to organize it, including finding mentors for the program. The program's internship options expanded to include non-coding work such as documentation and localization, and it opened up to non-student applicants. To increase chances of success, the new application process included making an improvement to the project, and the internship shifted to encouraging several tasks incrementally incorporated into the main project, instead of one larger project like Google Summer of Code. After restructuring the program and finding interested projects and mentors within GNOME, they selected eight interns in November 2010.

Another eight interns, from five continents, began in May 2011. They included Priscilla Mahlangu, a South African woman translating GNOME desktop software into the Zulu language. Twelve interns started in November 2011, with sponsorship from Collabora, Google, Mozilla, Red Hat, and the GNOME Foundation.

For the May 2012 round, the Software Freedom Conservancy joined the program with an internship with the Twisted project, mentored by Jessica McKellar. Nine other interns worked on GNOME.

=== Free and Open Source Software Outreach Program for Women ===
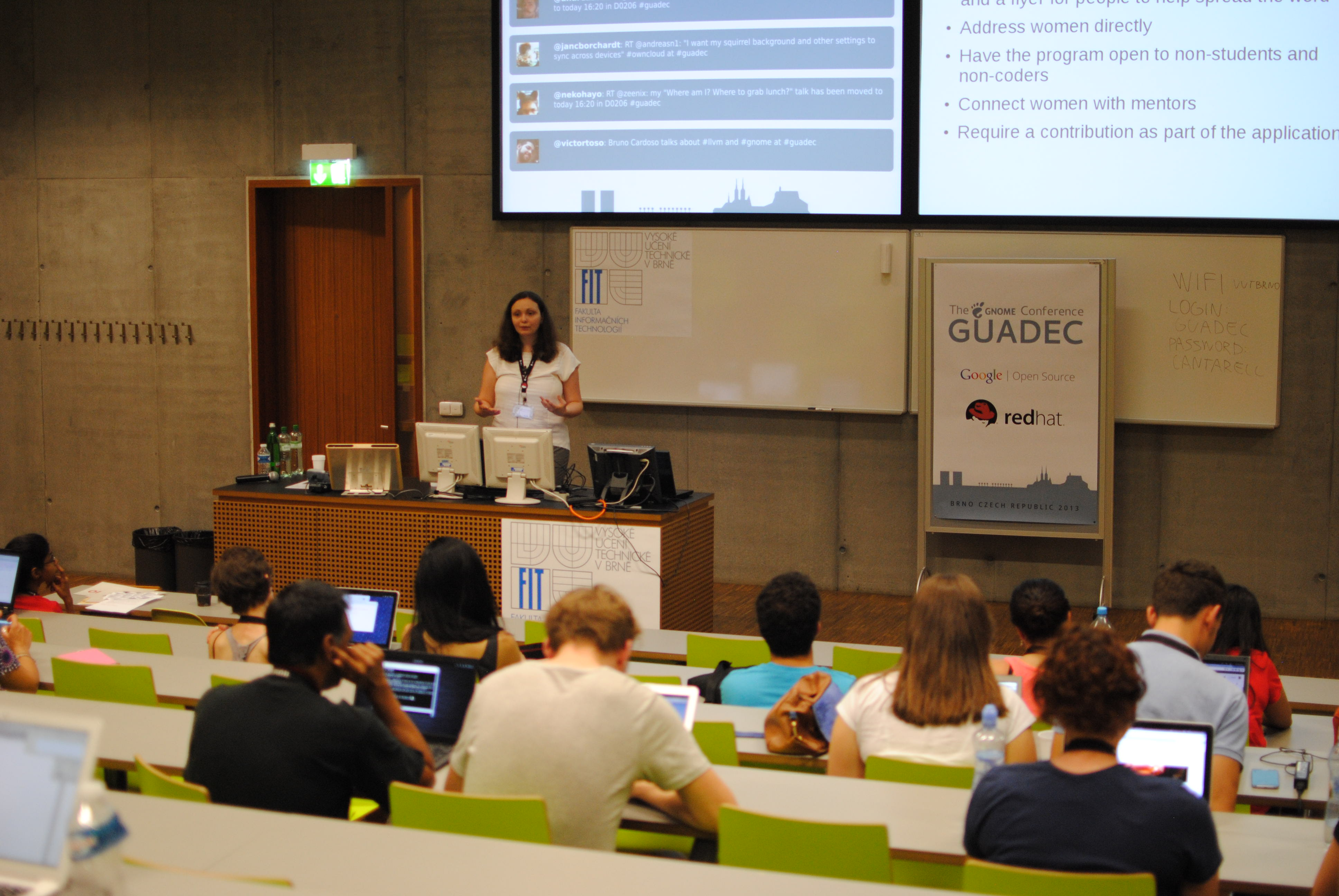
Marina Zhurakhinskaya presenting about the Outreach Program for Women at the GUADEC in August 2013

The January 2013 round of the program, renamed to the Free and Open Source Software Outreach Program for Women, expanded to provide 25 internships with 10 organizations (Deltacloud, Fedora, GNOME, JBoss, Mozilla, Open Technology Institute, OpenITP, OpenStack, Subversion, and Wikimedia), with GNOME Foundation Executive Director Karen Sandler joining Zhurakhinskaya in organizing the program.

The June 2013 internships included seven participants contributing to the Linux kernel, for example working on parallelizing the x86 boot process. Led by kernel contributor Sage Sharp, who found mentors and projects for the interns, they made significant contributions to the 3.11 kernel release. This round had 37 interns working with 16 organizations, and the next round starting in December 2013 had 30 interns working with 8 organizations.

In April 2014, the GNOME Foundation temporarily froze nonessential expenditures because of a budget shortfall linked to the Outreach Program for Women; it paid interns on a schedule that was sometimes before payments from sponsoring organizations arrived. This was related to the program growing quickly, and the Foundation said it would follow up with those organizations and take other steps to resolve the problem. GNOME Foundation board meeting notes from June 2015 indicate that the problem was resolved with all outstanding payments collected.

The May 2014 round had 40 participants and 16 organizations.

The December 2014 round was open to participants of the Ascend Project of any gender, a training program for people from groups underrepresented in open source.

=== Outreachy ===
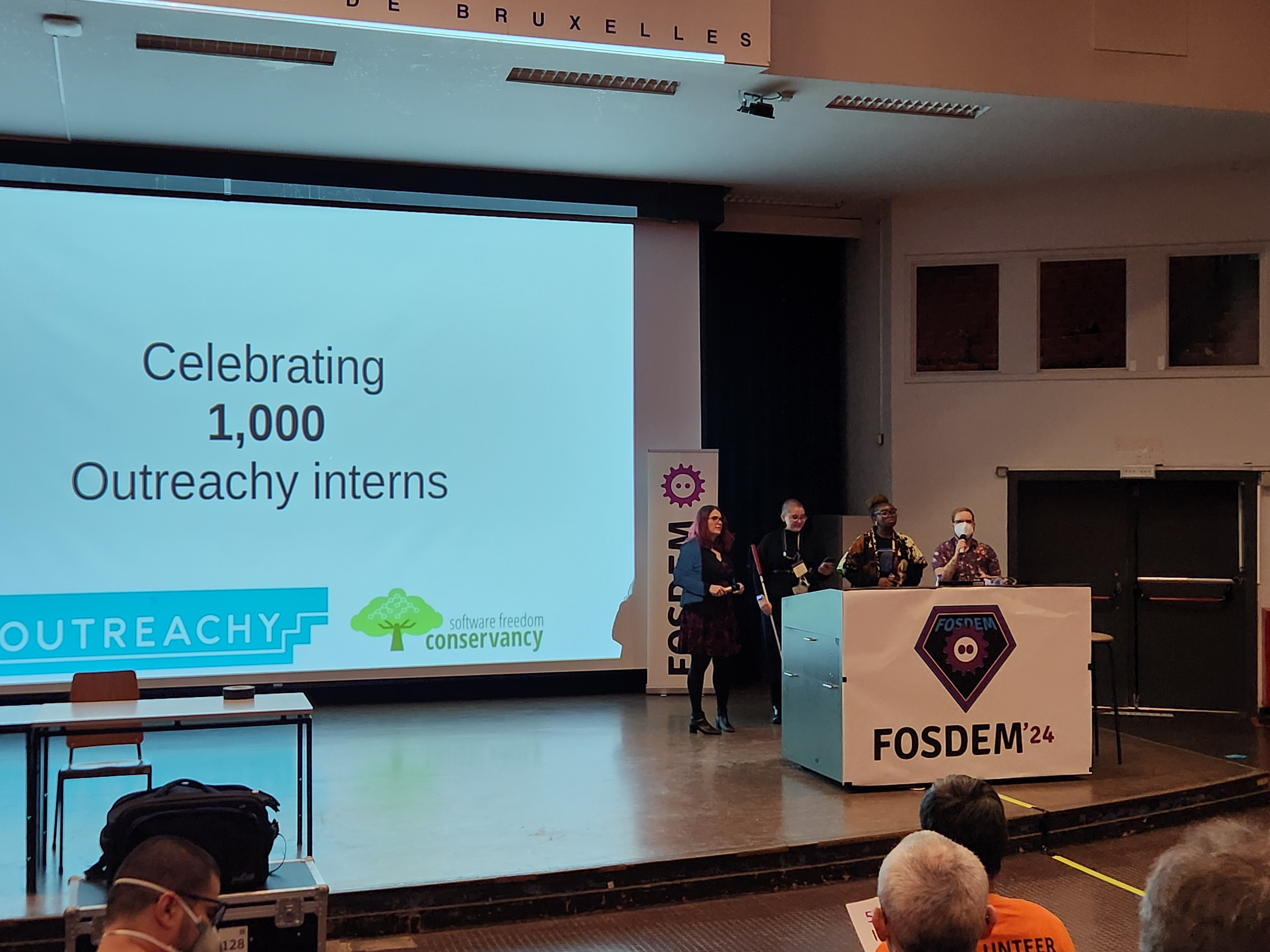
Four lead organizers of Outreachy celebrating 1,000 interns at FOSDEM 2024 in Brussels, Belgium. Left to right: Karen Sandler, Anna e só, Omotola E. Omotayo, Sage Sharp.

In February 2015, the program announced its rename to Outreachy, while management of the program transferred to the Software Freedom Conservancy with the GNOME Foundation participating as a partner.

Starting in September 2015, Outreachy became open to "residents and nationals of the United States of any gender who are Black/African American, Hispanic/Latin@, American Indian, Alaska Native, Native Hawaiian, or Pacific Islander", as people underrepresented in the technology industry in the US.

In 2023, Outreachy welcomed over 1,000 interns into the open source community. This achievement was commemorated through a series of six local celebrations across various countries and three virtual events. Since the beginning of the program, Outreachy collaborated with 40 open source communities, 191 mentors, and 488 contributors in facilitating contributions to open source software and open science projects. The open source communities saw 3,349 contributions merged from 764 applicants. In the 2023 cohorts, 121 interns worked full-time on open source projects for three months each. This commitment was met with a distribution of $847,000 in internship stipends to people facing discrimination and systemic bias.

== See also ==
- Ada Initiative
- LinuxChix
- Women in computing
- List of computer science awards
