= Celeste Lyn Paul =

American computer programmer

- Born: August 13, 1981 (age 44)
- Education: Ph.D. Human Centered Computing from University of Maryland, Baltimore County
- Known for: HacDC president, KDE usability project leader, and KDE e.V. board member
- Website: Celeste Lyn Paul

Celeste Lyn Paul (born 13 August 1981) is an expert in interface design and usability. She is a contributor to KDE.

== School ==
Celeste earned a B.A. in Multimedia from Duquesne University in 2003, an M.S. in Interaction Design & Information Architecture from the University of Baltimore in 2007, and a PhD in Human-Centered Computing from the University of Maryland, Baltimore County in 2013.

== Free software ==
Celeste participates in the KDE Usability Project since 2004, and designs KDE Human interface guidelines. She has led the KDE Usability Project since 2005. From 2009 to 2012, she served as a member of the KDE e.V. board of directors. Additionally, she held a seat on the Kubuntu Council from May 2008 to May 2010. She has also won Best Non-Application of Akademy Awards 2009 because her usability work.

== Hackerspace ==
Celeste is a member of the HacDC hackerspace and was voted in as president in 2015.
