= Open Works =

Makerspace in Baltimore, Maryland

- Formation: 2013
- Type: Non-profit
- Purpose: Hacking, DIY, Arts, Craft
- Location: United States
- Origin: Baltimore, MD
- General Manager: Will Holman
- Website: Official Website

Open Works is a 34,000 square feet "incubator for Baltimore's creative economy." It houses shared wood, metal, and digital fabrication, textiles, and electronics workspaces, as well as 150 private studios. They're also a Fab lab and have a mobile program. The $10m project's establishment was funded by Baltimore Arts Realty Corps. (BARCO), a non-profit dedicated to creating "safe, affordable, sustainable spaces for artists."

== See also ==
- Harford Hackerspace
