= University of Baltimore =

Public university in Baltimore, Maryland, US

Coordinates: 39°18′20″N 76°37′1″W

- Motto: Knowledge That Works
- Type: Public university
- Established: 1925; 101 years ago
- Parent institution: University System of Maryland
- Accreditation: MSCHE
- Academic affiliations: CUMU
- Endowment: $50.3 million (2020)
- President: Kurt L. Schmoke
- Provost: Ralph Mueller
- Faculty: 159
- Students: 3,232
- Undergraduates: 1,477 (2024)
- Postgraduates: 1,755 (2024)
- Location: Baltimore, Maryland, US
- Campus: Urban
- Colors: Blue
- Mascot: Eubie the Bee
- Website: www.ubalt.edu

The University of Baltimore (UBalt, UB) is a public university in Baltimore, Maryland, United States. It is part of the University System of Maryland. UBalt consists of four colleges in applied arts and sciences, business, law, and public affairs. The University of Baltimore School of Law is one of Maryland's two law schools.

== History ==
=== Early history ===
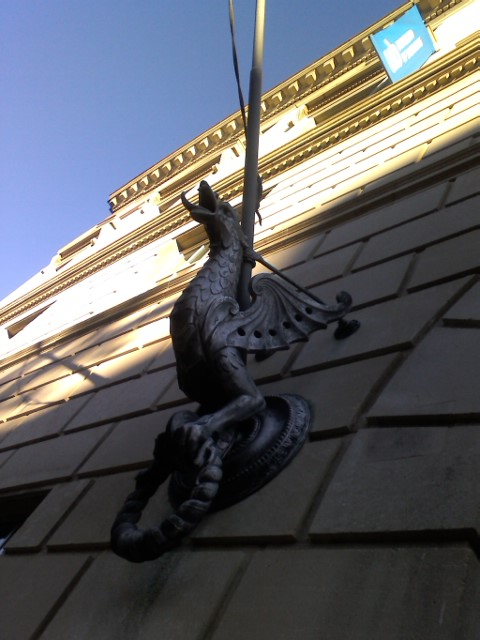
A "guard dragon" at the Liberal Arts and Policy building watches the southern entrance.

Founded by a group of Baltimore business professionals, UBalt originally sought to provide educational opportunities for working men and women, meaning that the first classes were held not above the ornate dragons of the current liberal arts and policy building, but in a four-story rowhouse on St. Paul St. in 1925.

In 1937, after the addition of day programs to augment the initial night courses, a full-scale junior college was added to the university's offerings. Other changes in the following decades included the construction of the Langsdale Library in 1966, according to an administrative history of the school. In the 1970s, UBalt merged with Eastern College, Mount Vernon School of Law, and Baltimore College of Commerce.

During the presidency of Thomas Granville Pullen, the university became regionally accredited in 1971 with the Middle States Association of Colleges and Schools and built the Langsdale Library. For a three-decade period that started in 1975 and would eventually end in 2007, UBalt became an "upper division academic institution," offering only third and fourth year undergraduate and post-graduate course work. Also in 1975, ownership was assumed by the state of Maryland.

In 1988, the state merged UBalt into the new statewide university system, the University of Maryland System, which was later renamed University System of Maryland.

=== Lower Division Initiative and later developments ===
The Lower Division Initiative was a program that began in 2005 to extend the University of Baltimore's position to once again offer the first two years of the baccalaureate degree. In April 2005, the University System of Maryland's board of regents approved plans that would allow UBalt to start accepting freshmen and sophomores. Under the original plan, freshmen and sophomore were to be admitted starting in the fall of 2006.

In a unanimous vote on February 15, 2006, the Maryland Higher Education Commission approved a revised mission statement submitted by the University of Baltimore, thus enabling the university to return to four-year undergraduate status. This was the same initiative that had received approval from the board of regents in 2005; however, the plan was revised slightly, calling for freshmen to be admitted in the fall of 2007.

The university stated that the new program better reflected the current focus and was designed to prepare students in business, pre-law, technology, public affairs, and applied liberal arts. It also said that it would offer freshmen "free" tuition for their first year, a benefit made possible by an anonymous private donor. An estimate stated that 140 freshmen were expected in the incoming class of fall of 2007.

Near the time of the change, the university also changed the school colors and adopted the new slogan, "Knowledge That Works".

Since beginning to accept freshmen again, UBalt has built a new, 12-story building for the university's law school along with the construction of additional residential capacity on campus. In May 2014, it was announced that Kurt L. Schmoke would become the university's eighth president, succeeding retired president Robert Bogomolny.

As of 2022, the renovation of Langsdale Library, which was renamed to Robert L. Bogomolny Library, was complete. The renovation was designed by the German architectural firm Behnisch Architekten, which had also been responsible for the design of the 2013 law school structure at Charles St. and Mount Royal Ave.

== Academics ==
The university offers numerous undergraduate, graduate, and professional as well as several certificate and joint degree programs. It offers 19 Bachelor of Arts and Bachelor of Science degree programs, spanning the arts and sciences, public affairs, and business.

At the master's level, UBalt offers a Master of Public Administration (MPA), a Master of Business Administration (previously offered jointly with Towson University), and 13 Master of Science and three Master of Art degrees. The MPA program was the first in the state to be fully accredited by the National Association of Schools of Public Affairs and Administration (NASPAA); it was also ranked #72 nationally in U.S. News & World Report's 2023-24 edition of "Best Grad Schools." The university offers two Master of Fine Arts degrees. The Practitioner Specialization of the M.S. in Counseling Psychology program is accredited by the master's in Psychology and Counseling Accreditation Council, and both the undergraduate and graduate programs in Criminal Justice are certified by the Academy of Criminal Justice Sciences. The university's master's degree in Applied Psychology, Counseling Psychology concentration, is accredited by the master's in Psychology and Counseling Accreditation Council (MPCAC). The law school offers a Master of Laws degree.

At the doctoral level, UBalt offers a program leading to a research-based Doctor of Science degree in Information and Interaction Design. UBalt also offers a Doctor of Public Administration. Through its law school, UBalt offers the Juris Doctor.

=== Undergraduate admissions ===
In 2024, the University of Baltimore accepted 85.5% of undergraduate applicants and is considered to have extremely easy admissions standards with applicant competition considered very low. Those enrolled had an average 2.89 high school GPA. The university does not require submission of standardized test scores, but they are considered when submitted. Those enrolled who submitted test scores had an average 1060 SAT score (12% submitting scores), with no ACT scores being reported.

=== Colleges and schools ===
The university is composed of multiple colleges and schools:

- Merrick School of Business
- School of Law
- Yale Gordon College of Arts and Sciences
- College of Public Affairs

== Campus and student services ==
Academic Center

The main campus is located in Baltimore's Mt. Vernon cultural district, close to downtown and the Inner Harbor. The Lyric Opera House, Joseph Meyerhoff Symphony Hall, and the Maryland Institute College of Art (MICA) are nearby. For the most part, the main academic buildings surround the intersections of Mount Royal Avenue and North Charles Street. Gordon Plaza is at the center of campus.

=== University buildings ===
The buildings include:

- H. Mebane Turner Learning Commons
- The Academic Center
- The Charles Royal Building
- John and Frances Angelos Law Center
- Robert L. Bogomolny Library
- UBalt Student Center
- William H. Thumel Sr. Business Center
- The Liberal Arts and Policy Building
- The Welcome Center

=== Student housing developments ===
The university, the Bozzuto Group, and the Gould Property Co. entered into a public-private joint venture to develop UBalt's Bolton Yard parking lot into a mixed use development, including apartments, a UBalt student bookstore, other retail, and garage parking. The project, which is named the Fitzgerald at UB Midtown, broke ground in 2008 and was largely complete by 2011.

The Fitzgerald project was viewed at the time of its inception as a prelude to future public-private development projects, such as more student housing. An October 2010 announcement indicated that the university was planning an 11-story student housing tower, to again be built in partnership with a private company, according to the Baltimore Sun. The student housing tower was largely complete by mid-2012.

According to a 2014 Baltimore Sun article, the university was considering building additional dormitory space on West Oliver Street, at the site of a facility currently used for postal vehicle maintenance. That development has yet to be named. According to a 2023 Baltimore Sun article, the university intends to enter into a ground-lease arrangement with the development firm Zahlco for the eventual creation of apartments and ground-floor retail on the former postal site.

=== Police and public safety ===
The University of Maryland, Baltimore (UMB) and University of Baltimore (UBalt) began a public safety collaboration in the first quarter of 2022. All police officers on the UBalt campus are employed by the UMB Police Department (UMBPD). The UMBPD is a fully certified law enforcement agency through the Maryland Police and Correctional Training Commissions (MPCTC).

UBalt maintains responsibility for campus security performed by unarmed, civilian security personnel known as the UBalt Safety and Security team. Uniformed officers from UMB — sworn, armed, and professionally trained and certified — are assigned to patrol the UBalt campus. At the same time, UBalt's Safety and Security staff provides building access and control, including office lockouts, welcome desk staffing, interior/exterior patrols, and more.

=== Local transit ===
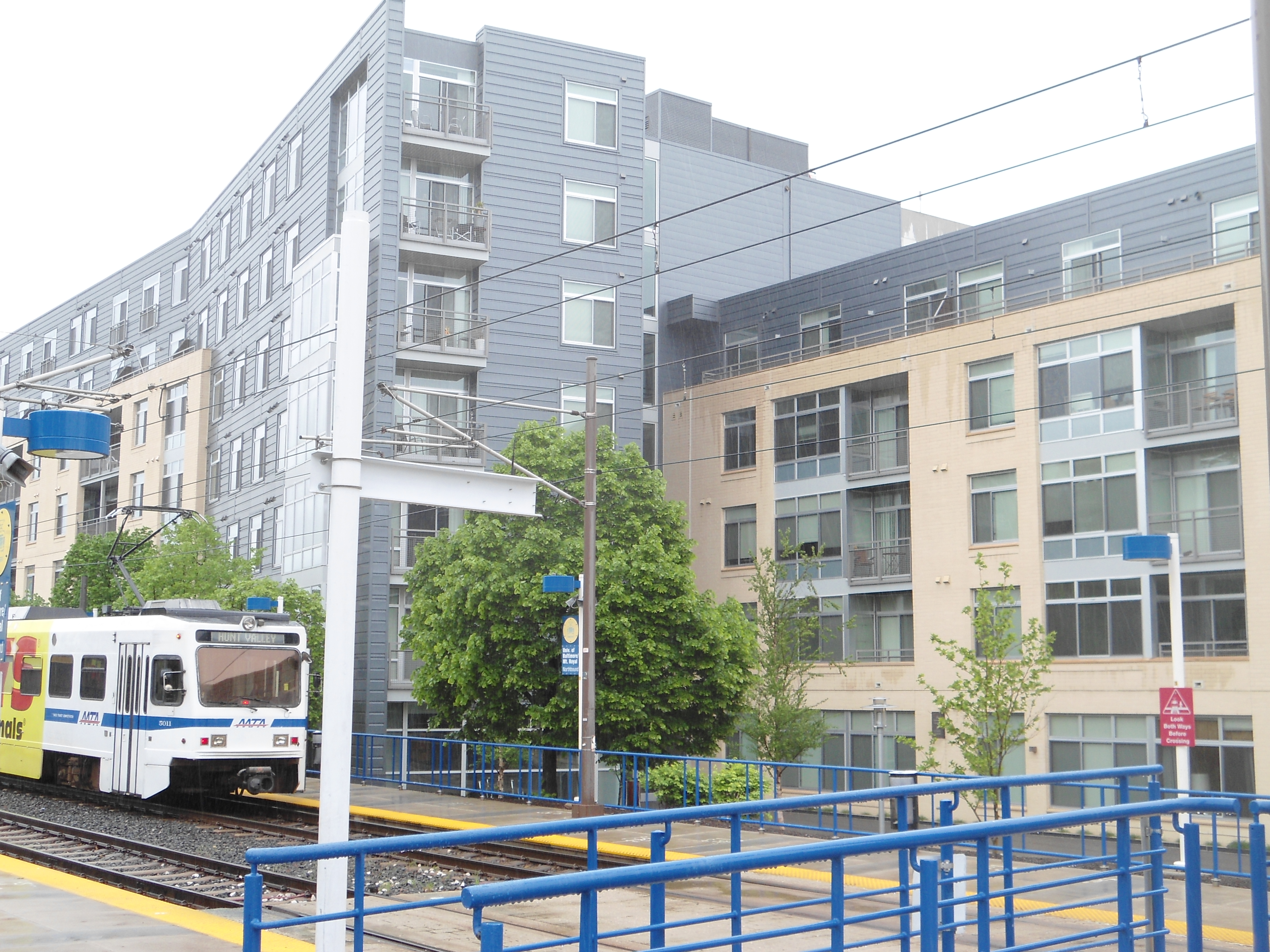
UB LRT stop at Mt. Royal Ave. In the background is the Fitzgerald building, one of two new student residence facilities at UB.

Penn Station, with connections to Amtrak and MARC service, and a Light Rail stop, are just to the north of campus. The University of Baltimore/Mt. Royal station on the Baltimore Light Rail system is on the northwest edge of campus. The State Center station on the Baltimore Metro system is just a few blocks from campus. UBalt runs shuttle bus service between its academic buildings, parking garages, and the nearby public transportation/local transit stops.

=== Satellite campuses ===
In conjunction with the University System of Maryland, UBalt offers courses and several undergraduate and graduate degree programs at the Universities at Shady Grove in Rockville, Maryland. Through a partnership with the College of Southern Maryland, UBalt offers the upper-level undergraduate coursework leading toward the bachelor's degree in business in Southern Maryland. UBalt also offers online classes.

== Student life ==
Undergraduate demographics as of fall 2023
Race and ethnicity	Total
Black	50%
White	26%
Hispanic	9%
Two or more races	5%
Asian	4%
Unknown	4%
International student	1%
Economic diversity
Low-income (Note: The percentage of students who received an income-based federal Pell grant intended for low-income students.)	44%
Affluent (Note: The percentage of students who are a part of the American middle class at the bare minimum.)	56%

UBalt has numerous academic clubs, student organizations, and an active student government; as of May 2017, more than 90 were listed on the university's website. The academic clubs usually sponsor a host of programs and speakers throughout the school year. Not all clubs are academic or sports-related, however: Clubs related to improv, crafting, religions, languages, and film are among the non-academic, non-sports options.

The UB Post is the monthly student newspaper, which serves the purpose of keeping the general student population informed of upcoming campus activities and relevant news. Run by students, it is available in print and online, and has been published since 1933. A student-run press, Plork, provides additional printing experience for students majoring in fields related to media design, publishing, and writing, as does the university's 50-year-old literary magazine, Welter.

The Student Center is the central place for students, housing The Hive market and cafe, the UB Campus Pantry, the Interfaith Space, student government and organization offices, and study lounges.

The University of Baltimore has not offered any varsity sports since 1983.

=== Student housing ===
From 2012 to 2017, the number of UBalt students living near campus increased 134 percent. Students have the option to live in The Varsity, located on West Biddle Street 0.2 miles from the campus, or in other private complexes nearby.

=== Campus recreation and wellness ===
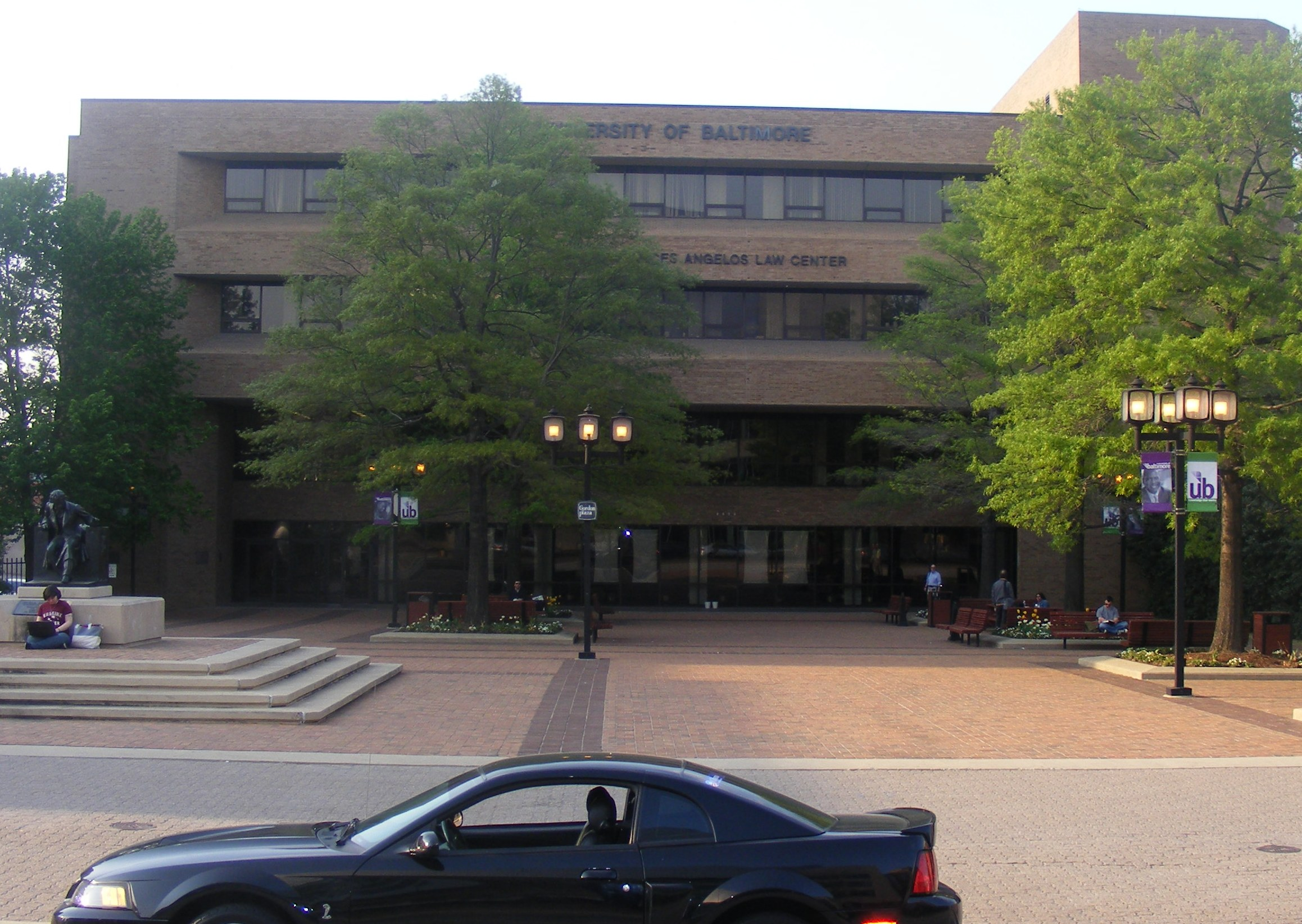

UBalt has an athletic/fitness center named Campus Recreation and Wellness. It has an aerobics studio, a sparring/boxing room, two indoor racquetball courts, a well-equipped gym, a basketball court, and locker rooms. The Recreation Center, located on the third and fourth floor of the Academic Center, offers fitness classes free of charge on a first-come, first-served basis to all members, and hosts the Sport Club and intramural sports teams.

Campus Recreation and Wellness offers instructional and competitive sport activities, including aerobics classes, golf lessons, intramural sports, informal recreation, and sport clubs. The Recreation Center facilities include basketball, racquetball, badminton and volleyball courts, weight and cardio rooms, aerobic and spinning studios, indoor golf cage, foosball, darts, Wii gaming system, locker rooms, and a sauna. The facilities are open to students, faculty, staff and Recreation Center members with valid UBalt BeeCards.

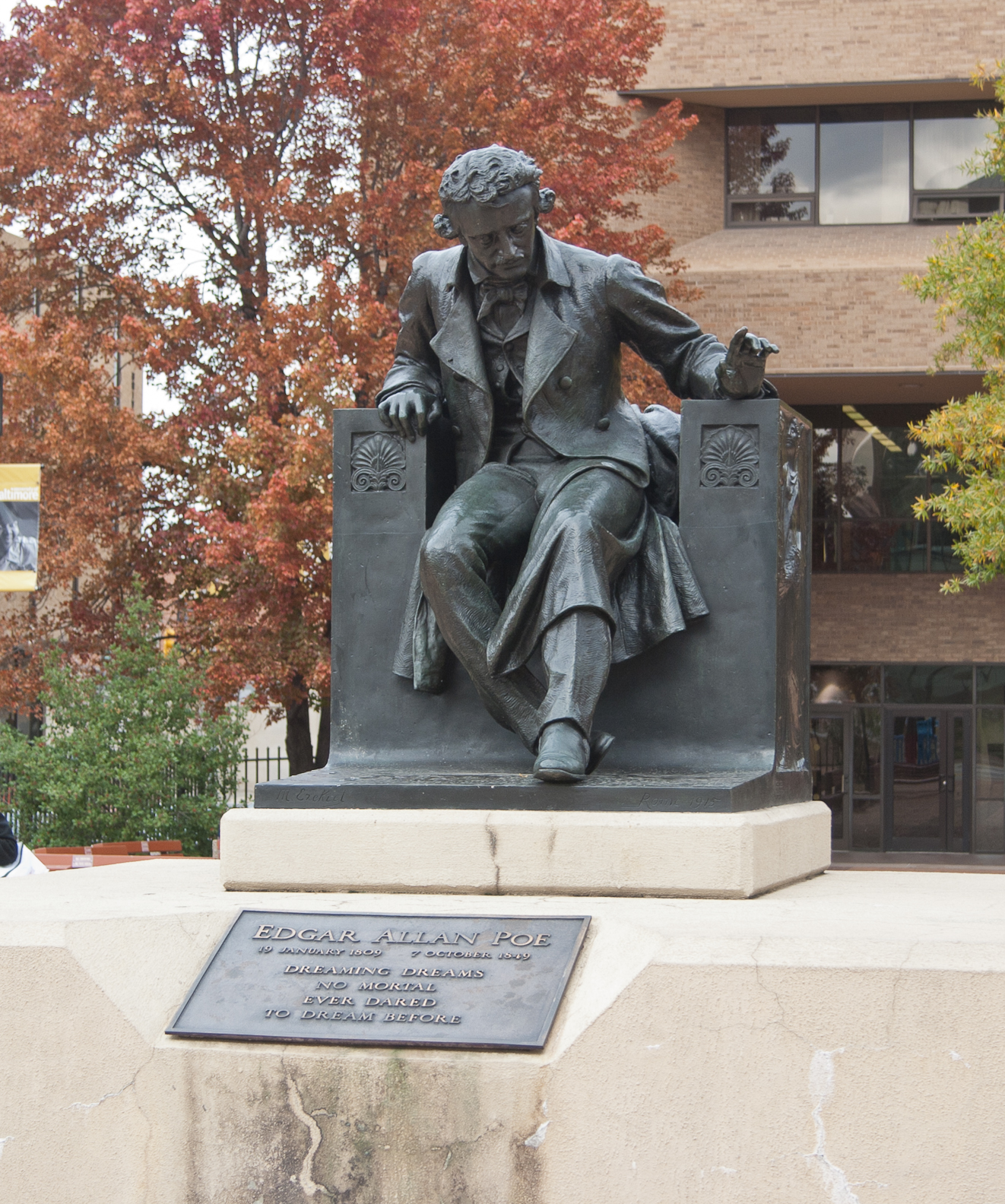
Edgar Allan Poe statue at the University of Baltimore

The UBalt men's lacrosse team won four USILA Division II national championships in four consecutive years, 1956–1959.

At one time, UBalt owned and operated a golf driving range in the Mount Washington neighborhood of Baltimore. However, this facility has been leased to the city.

=== Honor societies ===
The university hosts chapters of several honor societies, including:

- Alpha Chi
- Alpha Phi Sigma
- Beta Alpha Psi
- Beta Gamma Sigma
- Mu Kappa Tau
- Phi Alpha Theta
- Phi Theta Kappa
- Pi Alpha Alpha
- Pi Sigma Alpha
- Psi Chi
- Sigma Iota Epsilon
- Sigma Tau Delta
- Omicron Delta Kappa

== Notable alumni ==
=== Business ===
- Peter Angelos – owner of the Baltimore Orioles
- Tom Condon – graduated from UB Law in 1981, sports agent, represents over 120 NFL players
- Bob Parsons – founder of GoDaddy
- Stan White – retired NFL player with Baltimore Colts; graduated from UB Law; sports agent, sportscaster, assistant football coach at Gilman School

=== History, journalism, media, and the arts ===
- Carole Boston-Weatherford – author and critic
- Louis S. Diggs – Baltimore County historian
- Ellen Lupton – senior curator of Contemporary Design at Cooper Hewitt, Smithsonian Design Museum
- Fred Robbins – talk show host, actor and television personality
- John Waters – filmmaker, artist, activist
- D. Watkins – editor-at-large for Salon, New York Times bestselling author and HBO writer

=== Mathematics, sciences and technology ===
- Jeffrey Kluger – senior writer for TIME magazine specializing in science coverage; author of books including Lost Moon: The Perilous Voyage of Apollo 13, on which the 1995 movie Apollo 13 was based
- Celeste Lyn Paul – user interface design expert, KDE Usability Project head, president of HacDC

=== Politics, law and government ===
- Spiro Agnew – vice president of the United States 1969–1973, governor of Maryland 1967–1969
- Curt Anderson – Maryland House of Delegates District 43, 1983–1995, 2002–present
- Dale Anderson (1963) – former Baltimore County executive and state delegate
- John S. Arnick (1961) – former member of the Maryland House of Delegates
- Carville Benson (1893) – U.S. congressman for Maryland 2nd District, 1918–1921
- Lieutenant General H Steven Blum (1968) – former chief of the National Guard Bureau and deputy commander of NORTHCOM
- William P. Bolton (1909) – congressman for Maryland 2nd District, 1949–1951
- James W. Campbell (1969) – former member of the Maryland House of Delegates
- Jill P. Carter (1992) – Maryland state senator, 41st District
- J. Joseph Curran, Jr. (1959) – Maryland attorney general, 1987–2007; lt. governor 1983–1987 under Harry Hughes
- Arrie Davis – former judge on the Maryland Court of Special Appeals
- Terry R. Gilleland, Jr. (2001) – former member of Maryland House of Delegates
- Glen Glass (1994) – member of the Maryland House of Delegates from District 34A in Cecil County and Harford County
- J. B. Jennings – Maryland delegate for District 7
- Sheryl Davis Kohl – former member of Maryland House of Delegates
- Frank Kratovil – congressman, United States House of Representatives, Maryland District 1, 2009–2011
- Pat McDonough – Maryland delegate
- C. Edward Middlebrooks (1982) – former Maryland state senator
- Donald E. Murphy (1983) – former member of Maryland House of Delegates, 1994–2002
- Katie O'Malley (1991) – associate judge for the First District Court of Maryland, wife of former governor of Maryland and former Baltimore mayor, Martin O'Malley
- Sandra Peuler – judge of the Utah Third District Court in Salt Lake City
- Bishop Robinson – former police commissioner of Baltimore, 1984–1987
- Hyman A. Pressman (1933) – city comptroller of Baltimore 1963–1991
- Dutch Ruppersberger – congressman, 2nd district, 2002–present, Baltimore County executive, 1994–2002
- William Donald Schaefer (1942) – mayor of Baltimore 1971–1987, governor of Maryland 1987–1995, state comptroller 1999–2007
- John F. Slade III (1969) – former member of Maryland House of Delegates
- Frederic N. Smalkin – jurist-in-residence, University of Baltimore School of Law, 2005–present

=== Sports ===
- Dick Edell – lacrosse coach
- Red Holzman (1920–1998) – NBA 1948–53, 2-time NBA All-Star guard, coach, Hall of Fame
- Howard "Chip" Silverman – author and lacrosse coach
- Cheryl Van Kuren – 1988 Summer Olympics field hockey player
- Isaiah Wilson – NBA player 1971–1972
