= Akademy =

Annual conference of the KDE community

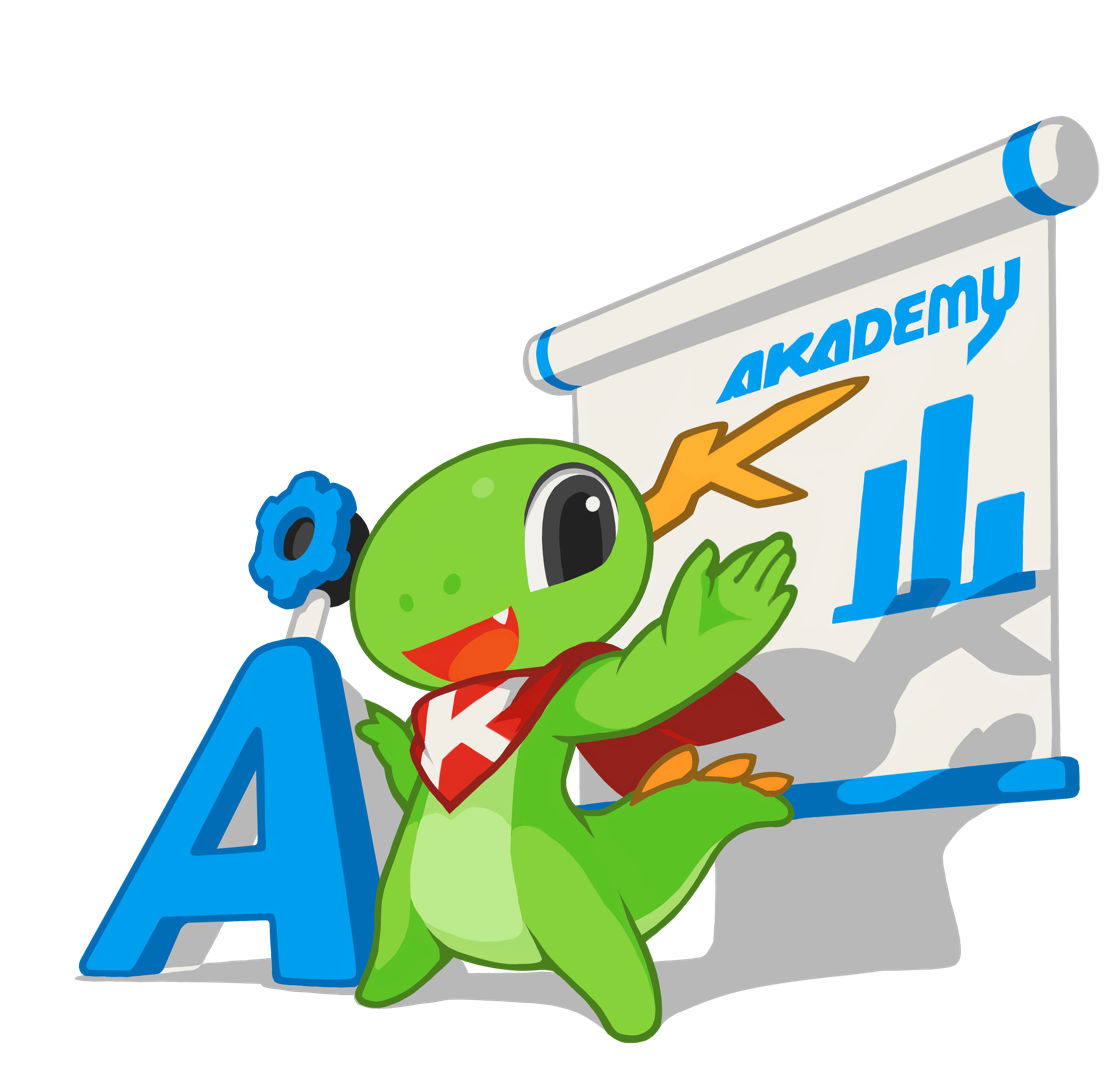
KDE's mascot Konqi and Akademy.

Akademy (capitalized as aKademy before 2009) is an annual contributors and users conference of the KDE community. Akademy is held at varying venues in Europe.

While Akademy usually takes place late summer or early autumn and is always held in Europe, Camp KDE, another contributors conference of the KDE community, is held in the Americas.

== Format ==
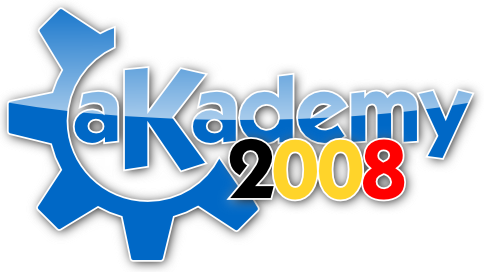
Akademy 2008 logo

The numbers below are the participation at the Akademy 2008.

- Two-day KDE conference, 350 people.
- One-day KDE e.V. meeting, 100 people.
- Five-day hacking session, 350 people at the start, 250 people at the end.
- Social program like a reception, party and optionally a sight-seeing tour.

== Conference history ==
Codenamed	Year	Venue	Date
KDE One	1997	Arnsberg, Germany	28 August–1 September
KDE Two	1999	Erlangen, Germany	7–10 October
KDE Three Beta	2000	Trysil, Norway	9–19 July
KDE Three	2002	Nürnberg, Germany	25 February–4 March
Kastle	2003	Nové Hrady, Czech Republic	22–30 August
aKademy 2004	2004	Ludwigsburg, Germany	21–29 August
aKademy 2005	2005	Málaga, Spain	26 August–4 September
aKademy 2006	2006	Dublin, Ireland	23–30 September
aKademy 2007	2007	Glasgow, United Kingdom	30 June–7 July
aKademy 2008	2008	Sint-Katelijne-Waver, Belgium	9–15 August
"Gran Canaria Desktop Summit", co-located with GUADEC	2009	Gran Canaria, Spain, Auditorio Alfredo Kraus	3–11 July
Akademy 2010	2010	Tampere, Finland	3–10 July
Desktop Summit, combined with GUADEC	2011	Berlin, Germany, Humboldt University of Berlin	6–12 August
Akademy 2012	2012	Tallinn, Estonia	30 June–6 July
Akademy 2013	2013	Bilbao, Spain	13–19 July
Akademy 2014	2014	Brno, Czech Republic	6–12 September
Akademy 2015	2015	A Coruña, Spain	25–31 July
QtCon, together with FSFE, VideoLAN and The Qt Company	2016	Berlin, Germany	2–8 September
Akademy 2017	2017	Almería, Spain	22–27 July
Akademy 2018	2018	Vienna, Austria	11–17 August
Akademy 2019	2019	Milan, Italy	7–13 September
Akademy 2020	2020	Online	4–11 September
Akademy 2021	2021	Online	18–25 June
Akademy 2022	2022	Barcelona, Spain	1–7 October
Akademy 2023	2023	Thessaloniki, Greece	15–21 July
Akademy 2024	2024	Würzburg, Germany	7–12 September
Akademy 2025	2025	Berlin, Germany	6–11 September
Akademy 2026	2026	Graz, Austria	19-24 September

== Akademy Awards ==
The yearly Akademy conference gives Akademy Awards, are awards that the KDE community gives to KDE contributors. There are three awards, best application, best non-application and jury's award.

Year	Jury	Best Application	Best Non-Application	Jury's Award
2005	Aaron Seigo, Brad Hards, David Faure and Matthias Ettrich	Albert Astals Cid and Enrico Ros for KPDF.	Lauri Watts for the KDE documentation.	Stephan Kulow and Oswald Buddenhagen for Subversion migration.
2006	Albert Astals Cid, Enrico Ros, Lauri Watts, Stephan Kulow and Oswald Buddenhagen	Boudewijn Rempt for Krita.	Alexander Neundorf for his work on CMake in KDE SC 4.	Laurent Montel for KDE4 Commit Champion.
2007	Boudewijn Rempt, Alexander Neundorf and Laurent Montel	Sebastian Trueg for K3b.	Matthias Kretz for Phonon.	Danny Allen for the KDE Commit-Digest.
2008	Sebastian Trueg, Matthias Kretz and Danny Allen	Mark Kretschmann for Amarok.	Nuno Pinheiro for Oxygen.	Aaron Seigo for Plasma.
2009	Mark Kretschmann, Nuno Pinheiro, Aaron Seigo	Peter Penz for Dolphin.	Celeste Lyn Paul for her usability work.	David Faure for greatest service to KDE.
2010	David Faure, Celeste Lyn Paul, Peter Penz	Aurélien Gâteau for Gwenview.	Anne Wilson for her community work.	Burkhard Lück for improving the state of KDE documentation.
2011	Aurélien Gâteau, Anne Wilson, Burkhard Lück	Martin Gräßlin for KWin.	Dario Andres for bug triaging team.	Tom Albers for building up a sysadmin team.
2012	Martin Gräßlin, Dario Andres, Tom Albers	Camilla Boeman for Calligra Words.	Lydia Pintscher for Google Summer of Code and Season of KDE	Kévin Ottens for his work on KDE Frameworks 5 and Nicolás Alvarez for his work on the conversion of KDE projects to git
2013	Lydia Pintscher, Kévin Ottens, Nicolás Alvarez and Camilla Boeman	Eike Hein for his work on Konversation	Vishesh Handa for taking over the Nepomuk maintainer hat and rocking at stabilizing the beast	Timothée Giet for shaping the future and community of Krita Kenny Duffus for being the memory and soul of Akademy
2020	Volker Krause, Nate Graham and Marco Martin	Bhushan Shah for creating a new platform, Plasma Mobile	Carl Schwan for his work of revamping KDE's websites	Luigi Toscano for his work on localization

== KDE One ==
KDE One is the first KDE community meeting with 15 participants, and budget is 14000 DEM (7158 EUR). The results of discussions are: KParts for embedding applications into each other, definition of a filesystem standard, all applications should be internationalized, need a list of keybindings that are obligatory for all applications, and need more and better documentation. The social event is a walk through the historical town of Arnsberg. The sponsors helped with money donations consists of S.u.S.E. GmbH, Caldera Inc., LST Software GmbH, O'Reilly Verlag, JF Lehmanns Buchhandlung, Delix Computer GmbH, Dorint Hotel Arnsberg-Neheim, and Wirtschaftsförderung Arnsberg GmbH.

== KDE Two ==
KDE Two is the second KDE community meeting with 40 participants, organized by SuSE and Caldera. KDE e.V. meeting elect the new board consists of Kurt Granroth (president), Chris Schläger (vice president), Mirko Boehm (treasurer), and Preston Brown (board member).

== Kastle ==
The KDE Contributor Conference (code-named Kastle) was held at the Zámek (Castle) in Nové Hrady, Czech Republic. The conference program consists of KDE e.V. membership meeting, technical Talks, brewery tour, and hacking festival. The conference is run by KDE e.V., the Academic and University Center Nove Hrady and the Polytechnic University of Upper Austria in Hagenberg.

== Conferences ==
=== aKademy 2004 ===
The KDE Community World Summit 2004 (code-named aKademy) take place at the Filmakademie Ludwigsburg. The conference is jointly organized by KDE e.V., Wirtschaftsförderung Region Stuttgart (WRS), and Linux New Media AG.

=== aKademy 2005 ===
The aKademy 2005 logo

The KDE Developers and Users Conference 2005 (code-named aKademy) take place at the University of Málaga. KDE e.V. Meeting take place at 26 August. KDE User and Administrator Conference takes place at 27 to 28 August. KDE Developers and Contributors Conference takes place at 29 to 30 August. Coding Marathon for KDE Developers and Contributors takes place at 31 August to 4 September.

=== aKademy 2006 ===
The aKademy 2006 takes place in Trinity College Dublin. The conference was focused on KDE SC 4, desktop standards and cross-project collaboration, and meeting the community.

=== aKademy 2007 ===
The aKademy 2007 takes place at the Graham Hills Building, University of Strathclyde.

=== Akademy 2008 ===
The Akademy 2008 takes place at Campus De Nayer, Lessius Hogeschool.

=== Akademy 2010 ===
The presentation about Wikimedia UX at Akademy 2010

The Akademy 2010 was held in the main building of the University of Tampere from July 2–9, 2010.

=== Akademy 2017 ===
The Akademy 2017 was held in Universidad de Almería (UAL) in Almería, Spain, from July 22–27, 2017.

Stalls at the conference were held by LibreOffice, Slimbook, and SUSE, among others.

=== Akademy 2018 ===
The Akademy 2018 was held at TU Wien in Vienna, Austria, from Saturday 11th to Friday 17 August.

== Akademy-es ==
Year	Venue	Date
2006	Barcelona	3–5 March
2007	Zaragoza	17–18 November
2008	A Coruña	21–23 November
2009	Gran Canaria	10–11 July
2010	Bilbao	7–9 May
2011	Barcelona	20–22 May
2012	Zaragoza	18–20 May
2013	Bilbao	11–12 July
2014	Málaga	11–12 July
2015	A Coruña	23–24 July
2016	Madrid	15-17 April
2017	Almeria	20-21 July
2018	Valencia	11-13 May
2019	Vigo	28-30 June
2020	Online	20-22 November
2021	Online	19-21 November
2022	Barcelona	29-30 September
2023	Málaga	9-10 June
2024	Valencia	24-25 May
2025	Málaga	20-21 June

Akademy-es is a conference for Spanish community since 2006, aimed at Spanish speakers. The event is organized by Spanish local organization. KDE España organizes the event since 2008. The annual KDE España Assembly takes place during the event.

Akademy-es 2006 was held at Espai Jove Bocanord in Barcelona, organized by Badopi. Akademy-es 2007 was hosted by Hispalinux, Wireless Zaragoza, and the Zaragoza council. Akademy-es 2008 was held at University of A Coruña, was organized by the KDE España and GPUL, sponsored by Oficina de Software Libre da Universidade da Coruña, Mancomun, Igalia, Qt Software and eyeOs. Akademy-es 2009 was held in the University of Las Palmas de Gran Canaria. Akademy-es 2010 was held in the Engineering Technical School of Bilbao, was organized by KDE España and Itsas. There were approximately 80 participants. The KDE España Assembly elected the new board consists of Albert Astals Cid (president), Rafael Fernández López (vice president), Aleix Pol (secretary), and José Millán Soto (treasurer). Akademy-es 2011 was organized by KDE España, was sponsored by Google and Nokia, and was supported by the Linux and Todo-Linux magazines. The event was held in two different locations: the Polytechnic University of Catalunya for presentations of first day, The School of Sant Marc de Sarrià for last two day.

== Akademy-BR ==
Akademy-BR
Year	Venue	Date
2010	Salvador	9–11 April
2011	São Paulo	12–15 November

Akademy-BR is addressed to Brazilian community since 2010. The purpose of the meeting is to gather and organize ideas Brazilian developers on how to help KDE in Brazil. Akademy-BR 2010 was organized by the local group named LiveBlue. There were thirty participants from all over Brazil. Akademy-BR 2011 is organized by KDE-MG.

== See also ==
- List of computer-related awards
