= GNOME Project =

Open source community

- Founded: August 1997; 29 years ago
- Founder: Miguel de Icaza and Federico Mena
- Type: Community
- Purpose: Open source
- Products: GNOME, GTK, GLib, and others
- Method: Development and documentation
- Parent organization: GNOME Foundation
- Website: gnome.org

GNOME Project is a community behind the GNOME desktop environment and the software platform upon which it is based. It consists of all the software developers, artists, writers, translators, other contributors, as well as active users of GNOME. The GNOME Foundation used to recognize GNOME as part of GNU; however, in 2021, the staff of the Foundation declared that GNOME is not a GNU Project.

== GNOME Foundation ==
In August 2000, the GNOME Foundation was set up to deal with administrative tasks and press interest, and to act as a contact point for companies interested in developing GNOME software. While not directly involved in technical decisions, the Foundation does coordinate releases and decide which projects will be part of GNOME. Membership is open to anyone who has made a non-trivial contribution to the project. Members of the Foundation elect a board of directors every November, and candidates for the positions must be members themselves.

== Programs and events ==
The GNOME Project holds several community programs and events, usually tailored to local users and developers. The main gathering of GNOME contributors is the GNOME Users And Developers European Conference (GUADEC), an annual conference used to discuss the development and progress of GNOME. The idea of GUADEC events is attributed to the GNOME developers' and users' Paris meeting of 1998. There is an annual Asian conference called GNOME.Asia. GNOME also participated in the Desktop Summit, which is a joint conference organized by the GNOME and KDE communities that was held in Europe in 2009 and 2011.

Among the project's community programs is Outreachy, established with the goals of increasing women participation and improving the resources available to all newcomers for getting involved in GNOME.

== Subprojects ==
GNOME Project is involved in development of a range of notable software, including:

- GNOME Shell – Graphical shell of the GNOME desktop environment
- GNOME Core Applications – Software applications built with the GNOME philosophy in mind
- GTK – Free and open-source cross-platform widget toolkit for creating graphical user interfaces
- GLib – Software library
- GObject Introspection – Free software library
- Client-Side Decoration – Graphical user interface design concept
- GDM – Display manager for the windowing systems X11 and Wayland
- Mutter – GNOME window manager and display server
- Adwaita (design language) – Design language and theme of the GNOME desktop environment
- Orca (assistive technology) – Accessibility software
- And many more.

== Collaboration with other projects ==
The GNOME Project actively collaborates with other free software projects. Previous collaboration efforts were ordinarily organized on project-to-project basis. To make the collaboration broader, the freedesktop.org project was founded.

== Goals ==
The project focuses on:

- Independence – the governing board is democratically elected and technical decisions are made by the engineers doing the work.
- Freedom – development infrastructure and communication channels are public, the code can be freely downloaded, modified and shared and all contributors have the same rights.
- Connectedness – work spans the entire Free software stack.
- People – emphasis on accessibility and internationalization. GNOME is available in more than 40 languages (at least 80 percent of strings translated) and is being translated to 190 languages.

== See also ==
- GNOME Core Applications
