= GNOME Foundation =

U.S. nonprofit organization

- Founded: 5 March 2001
- Type: 501(c)(3)
- Headquarters: 21c Orinda Way, Orinda, CA 94563, United States
- Product: GNOME
- Key people: Steven Deobald
- Revenue: ▲US$2,892,213 (2025)
- Expenses: ▼US$934,099 (2025)
- Employees: 22
- Volunteers: 150
- Website: foundation.gnome.org

The GNOME Foundation is a non-profit organization based in Orinda, California, United States, which works to coordinate the efforts in the GNOME project. The GNOME Foundation works to further the goal of the GNOME project: to create a computing platform for use by the general public that is composed entirely of free software.

== Foundation ==
While the GNOME Project was founded in 1997, the GNOME Foundation was officially founded on 5 March 2001 by CollabNet, Compaq, Debian, Eazel, Free Software Foundation, Gnumatic, Henzai, Inc., Helix Code, IBM, Red Hat, Sun Microsystems, and VA Linux Systems. Although a news report from the BBC news showed a different membership status on 16 August 2000, it listed companies and organizations such as Sun Microsystems, IBM, Compaq, Hewlett-Packard, Red Hat, Eazel, Free Software Foundation, Gnumatic, Helix Code, Henzai, Object Management Group, TurboLinux, and VA Linux.

== Purpose ==
The GNOME Foundation's main goal is to create a free, personal, software-based computing ecosystem for the world.

To achieve this goal, the foundation coordinates releases of GNOME and determines which projects are a part of GNOME. The foundation acts as an official voice for the GNOME project, providing a means of communication with the press and with commercial and noncommercial organizations interested in GNOME software. The foundation produces educational materials and documentation to help the public learn about GNOME software. In addition, it sponsors GNOME-related technical conferences, such as GUADEC, GNOME. Asia, and the Boston Summit, represents GNOME at relevant conferences sponsored by others, helps create technical standards for the project, and promotes the use and development of GNOME software.

== Donations ==
The GNOME Foundation primarily relies on sponsorships from individuals and companies in various models. Such models include one-time donations, recurring donations or constant annual financial contributions. Additionally, these said donations are also pledged in the form of companies hiring people to work on the GNOME Project. Companies also sponsor events which aid the foundation in their efforts.

== Management ==
The GNOME Executive Director is selected and hired by the GNOME Board of Directors.

Between 2008 and 2010, Stormy Peters served as the foundation's executive director. She was replaced in June 2011 by Karen Sandler, who served until March 2014. Following Sandler's departure, the GNOME Board announced that cash reserves had been drained due to a cash flow problem, as the GNOME Foundation had to front the costs of late payments from sponsors of the 'Outreach Program for Women'. Spending for non-essential activities was therefore frozen to allow the cash reserves to recover throughout 2014. This led to various rumors that the GNOME foundation had gone bankrupt, which the GNOME foundation has clarified never happened.

The executive director position remained unfilled until February 2017, when former Debian leader Neil McGovern was appointed. In February 2022, Neil McGovern resigned as executive director of the GNOME Foundation. A call for job applications was opened for the executive director role in August 2022, and was subsequently reopened with a modified job description in May 2023.

Holly Million was announced executive director on 17 October 2023. She stepped down from her role only nine months later. Richard Littauer served as interim executive director until 8 May 2025, when Steven Deobald was appointed. On 29 August, the GNOME Foundation announced that Deobald would be stepping down, less than four months after assuming the role.

== Membership ==
All GNOME contributors can apply for Foundation membership. All members are eligible to stand for the Board of Directors, vote in Board elections, and suggest referendum for voting.

== Advisory board ==
The foundation's Advisory Board is a body of organizations and companies that wish to communicate and work closely with the board of directors and the GNOME project. Organizations may join the advisory board for an annual fee of between US$11500 and US$23000, or be invited as a non-profit.

As of 2024, Advisory Board members include: Canonical Ltd., Debian, Endless Computer, Google, Red Hat, Sugar Labs, SUSE, and The Document Foundation.

== GNOME Patent Troll Defense Fund ==
In September 2019, Rothschild Patent Imaging (RPI) filed a lawsuit against GNOME Foundation claiming that Shotwell infringed on its patent because "[Shotwell] imports and filters photographic images from cameras, allowing users to organise the photos and share them on social media". GNOME Foundation called allegations baseless and started a defense aimed not just to defend Shotwell, but to invalidate the patents in question altogether. To finance the defense, GNOME launched GNOME Patent Troll Defense Fund. On 23 October 2019, Debian Foundation publicly stated their support for GNOME Foundation and urged users to donate to the fund. In October 2019, Open Innovation Network announced that their lawyers would assist help GNOME Foundation in discovery process to find prior art to invalidate the patent claims. The GNOME Patent Troll Defense fund received support of over 4000 contributors and surpassed the original goal of US$125,000.

On 20 May 2020, GNOME Foundation announced resolution of the patent case. The sides have settled on the following conditions:

- GNOME received a release and covenant not to be sued for any patent held by Rothschild Patent Imaging
- Both Rothschild Patent Imaging and Leigh Rothschild grant a release and covenant from material part of infringement allegations to any software released under an existing Open Source Initiative approved license and subsequent versions of thereof, including for the entire Rothschild portfolio of patents

Thus Rothschild Patent Imaging and Leigh Rothschild keep their original patent, but GNOME Foundation and any project released under OSI-approved license is immune from any future patent claims made by Rothschild Patent Imaging and Leigh Rothschild.

== See also ==
- GNOME
- Patent troll
