= Hanna Wallach =

Computational social scientist

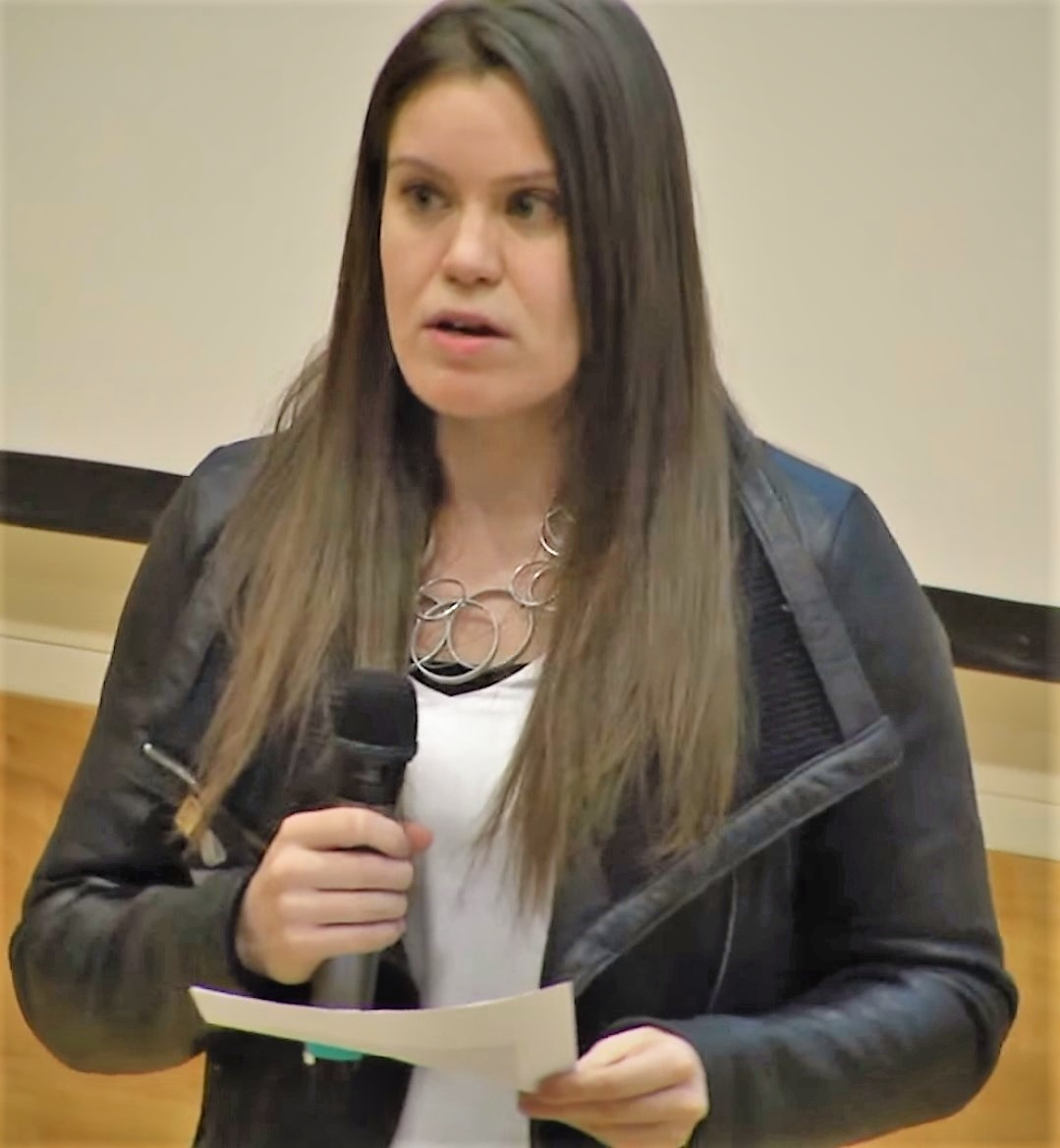
- Wallach in 2016
- Education: University of Cambridge; University of Edinburgh
- Known for: Computational Social Science, Machine Learning, Fairness in Artificial Intelligence
- Scientific career
- Fields: Computer Science
- Workplaces: Microsoft Research; University of Massachusetts Amherst
- Thesis: Structured topic models for language. (2008)
- Website: Personal website

Hanna Megan Wallach (born 1979) is a computational social scientist, Vice President, and Distinguished Scientist at Microsoft Research. Her work makes use of machine learning models to study the dynamics of social processes. Her current research focuses on issues of fairness, accountability, transparency, and ethics as they relate to AI and machine learning.

== Early life and education ==
Wallach graduated with a BA in Computer Science from Newnham College, Cambridge in 2001. She moved to the University of Edinburgh for her graduate studies. Here she focused on cognitive science and machine learning. Wallach completed her doctoral research at the University of Cambridge. Her research considered language models.

== Career ==
Her early research considered the development of natural language processing which analyses the structure and content of social processes. Wallach explained that social interactions have several things in common; structure (i.e. who is involved in the interaction), content (the information that is shared during or arises from these interactions) and dynamics (the structure and content can change over time). She worked alongside journalists and computer scientists to better understand how organisations function. In 2007 she joined the University of Massachusetts Amherst, where she was made Assistant Professor in 2010.

At Microsoft Research Wallach investigates fairness and transparency in machine learning. In 2020 she worked with machine learning practitioners from across the tech sector to create an artificial intelligence ethics checklist. The checklist aimed to provide clear guidelines for the ethical development of artificial intelligence systems.

== Awards and honours ==
- 2001 Science, Engineering & Technology Student of the Year
- 2002 University of Edinburgh Best MSc Student in Cognitive Science
- 2010 Best Paper Award at the International Conference on Artificial Intelligence and Statistics
- 2014 Glamour magazine 35 Women Under 35 Who Are Changing the Tech Industry
- 2015 Elected to the International Machine Learning Society's Board of Trustees
- 2016 AnitaB.org Early Career Award
- 2018 Program Chair for the Conference on Neural Information Processing Systems
- 2019 General Chair for the Conference on Neural Information Processing Systems

== Selected publications ==
- Wallach, Hanna M. (2006). "Topic modeling". Proceedings of the 23rd international conference on Machine learning - ICML '06. New York, New York, USA: ACM Press. pp. 977–984. doi:10.1145/1143844.1143967. ISBN 1-59593-383-2. S2CID 1174898.
- Wallach, Hanna M.; Murray, Iain; Salakhutdinov, Ruslan; Mimno, David (2009-06-14). Evaluation methods for topic models. New York, NY, USA: Association for Computing Machinery. pp. 1105–1112. doi:10.1145/1553374.1553515. ISBN 978-1-60558-516-1. S2CID 10910725.
- Mimno, David; Wallach, Hanna M.; Talley, Edmund; Leenders, Miriam; McCallum, Andrew (2011-07-27). "Optimizing semantic coherence in topic models". Proceedings of the Conference on Empirical Methods in Natural Language Processing. EMNLP '11. Edinburgh, United Kingdom: Association for Computational Linguistics: 262–272. ISBN 978-1-937284-11-4.

== Personal life ==
Wallach is a competitive roller derby player. She is an advocate for the improved representation of women working in computer science. She was co-founder of the now annual Women in Machine Learning workshop, Debian Women Project and GNOME Outreach Program for Women (now Outreachy).
