= Baltimore Hackerspace =

Hackerspace in Baltimore, Maryland

- Formation: 2009
- Purpose: Hacking, Hobbyist, DIY
- Location: United States
- Origin: Baltimore, MD
- Founders: David Powell, Jason McMahon, Miles C Dodgson Pekala, Chris Cockrum, Paul King, Gary Cygel
- Website: baltimorehackerspace.com
- Formerly called: Harford Hackerspace

Baltimore Hackerspace is a hackerspace, sometimes called a makerspace, located in Baltimore, Maryland. Its creation has been inspired and modeled after the many other Hackerspaces around the United States and Europe.

== About ==
Harford Hackerspace was founded in January 2009 to fill the gap of a hackerspace in the Baltimore area. At the time, there wasn't another hackerspace within a reasonable distance. Originally set out to be in Harford County, Maryland, the name Harford Hackerspace was born. After the first few meetings, it was realized that the majority of the founding members resided within Baltimore, Maryland. Therefore, within its first month, the hackerspace was relocated to Baltimore where it became the first hackerspace in Baltimore. Although residing in Baltimore, the group was still incorporated under the name Harford Hackerspace. Beginning in 2013 the name problem was rectified by filing paperwork to register the group officially as Baltimore Hackerspace the name in which the group now operates as.

With the help of Nick Farr of former HacDC fame, the group sorted through the paperwork and became one of the first registered non-profit 501(C)(3) charitable organization hackerspaces. Their mission is to create an environment where people could collaborate on ideas, share resources and talents, and learn from each other—all within a social environment.

== Notable Mentions ==
- Do It Yourself CNC featured in the book "Hack This: 24 Incredible Hackerspace Projects from the DIY Movement" by John Baichtal.
- Red Bull Creation 2011 finalist.
- Winner of "Best Hardware Prototype - Group" project in Baltimore Hackathon 2010.
- Project featured on MSDN Channel 9.

== Local Involvement ==
- Regular Exhibitor at RobotFest and Electronica Fest that both take place at the National Electronics Museum.
- Participation in the first Betascape which was a part of Artscape at the time.
- The group currently operates 1250 sqft warehouse facility. The facility is open to the community and provides classes and access to tools, small fabrication machinery, and workspace.
