= Stormy Peters =

American information technology industry analyst

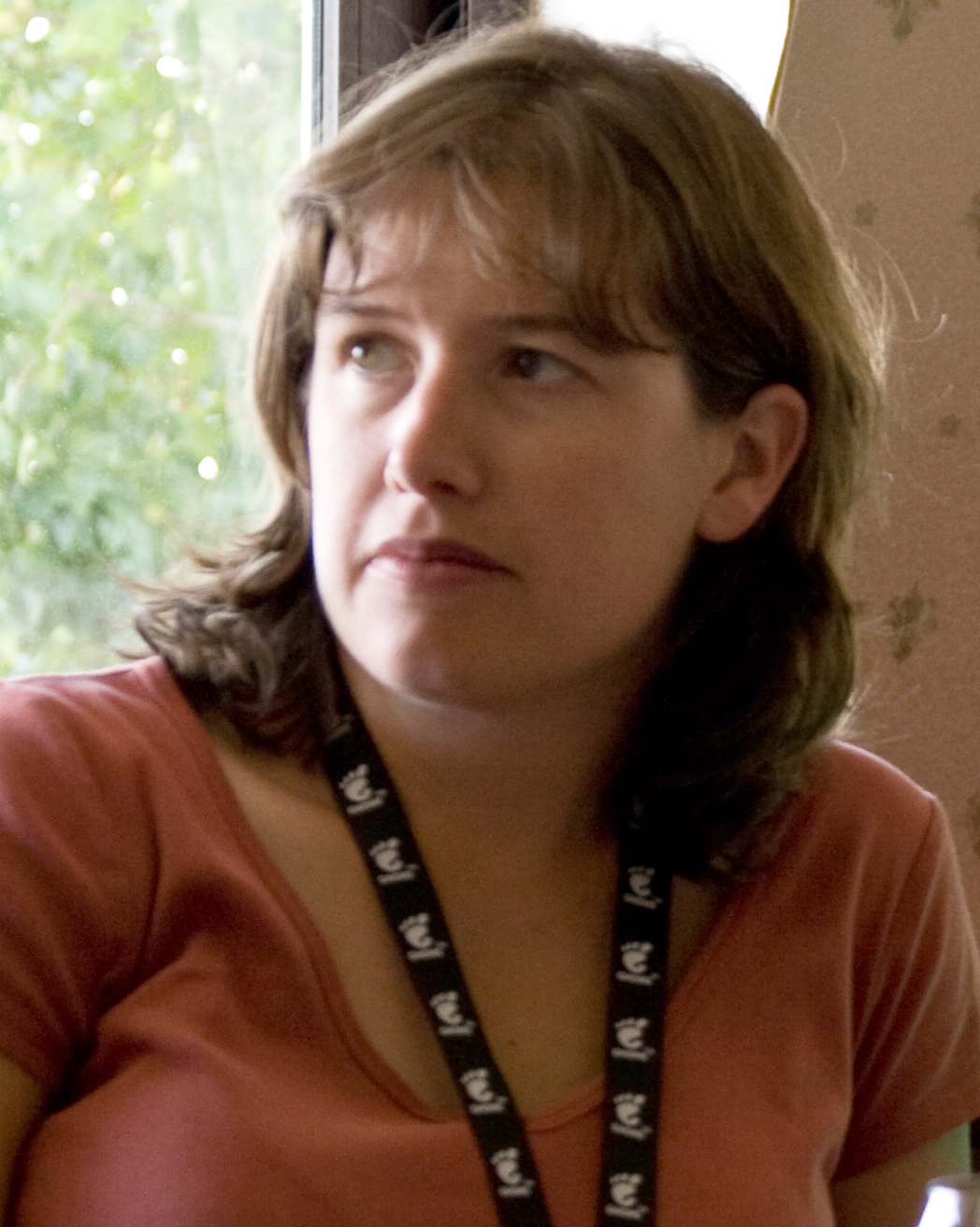
- Stormy Peters at GUADEC 2008
- Born: Robyn Peters
- Occupation: Information technologist
- Employer: Microsoft
- Known for: free and open source software advocacy
- Website: http://www.stormyscorner.com/

Stormy Peters is an information technology industry analyst and prominent free and open source software (FOSS) advocate, promoting business use of FOSS. She advocates as a consultant and conference speaker. She co-founded, and was later appointed as executive director of the GNOME Foundation. She previously worked for Mozilla Corporation, Cloud Foundry, and Red Hat. In August 2019 she joined Microsoft.

Peters's birth name is Robyn; however, she has not gone by that name since her childhood.

== Career ==
Peters completed a Bachelor of Arts with a major in computer science at Rice University and initially worked as a software engineer for Hewlett-Packard in their Unix development team.

In approximately 1999 Peters was managing the HP-UX desktop development and became aware of the GNOME project when the team decided to provide GNOME on HPUX. Peters had a role in explaining the Open Source business and intellectual property models to Hewlett-Packard management. She later founded the Hewlett-Packard Open Source Program Office. In 2000 she became one of the founding members of the GNOME Foundation Advisory board.

In December 2005 Peters became Director of Product Management for OpenLogic, an Open Source services company. In July 2008 Peters left OpenLogic and became the executive director of the GNOME Foundation. Her role was in coordinating with sponsors, business development and marketing. In November 2010 she left to Mozilla. Between July 2011 to June 2012 she was a member of the GNOME Board of Directors.

Peters has given keynote talks to many Open Source conferences including the Open Source Business Conference, linux.conf.au, the 2008 and 2009 GNOME.Asia summit in Beijing and Ho Chi Minh City respectively, and the Ohio Linuxfest in 2010.

In August 2019 Peters became the Director of the Open Source Programs Office at Microsoft.
