= Zulip =

Open source chat and collaboration software

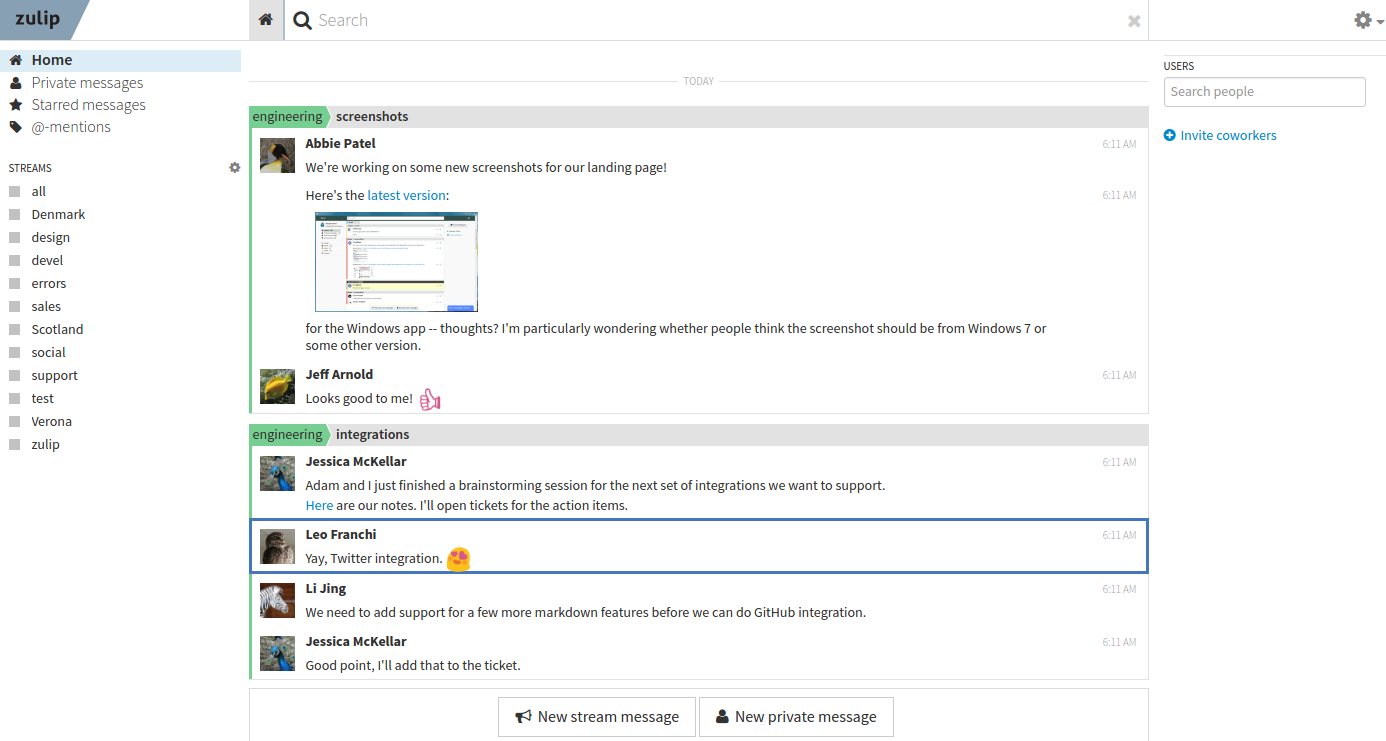
- Screenshot of the Zulip web interface
- Original authors: Jeff Arnold, Waseem Daher, Jessica McKellar, and Tim Abbott
- Developer: Zulip Foundation
- Release: 2012
- Stable release: Zulip Server 12.3 / September 21, 2026; 41 days ago
- Preview release: Zulip Server 13.0-rc1 / October 31, 2026; 1 day ago
- Written in: Python, JavaScript (web frontend), React Native (iOS and Android), Electron (desktop apps)
- Operating system: Windows, macOS, Linux, iOS, Android
- Type: Collaborative software
- License: Apache License 2.0
- Website: zulip.com
- Repository: github.com/zulip/zulip

Zulip is an open source chat and collaborative software created by Jeff Arnold, Waseem Daher, Jessica McKellar, and Tim Abbott in 2012. It is one of the free and open source alternatives to Slack.

== History ==
In 2014, Dropbox acquired Zulip. The service did not receive much attention at Dropbox and the company open sourced Zulip in 2015. In 2016, Tim Abbott left Dropbox and established Kandra Labs to continue development of Zulip.

In 2026, the Zulip Foundation was formed and became the steward of the project. It also became owner of Kandra Labs.

== Software overview ==
In Zulip, communication occurs in streams (which are like channels in IRC). Each stream can have several topics – Zulip features a unique threading model, in which each message also has a topic, along with the content. Zulip claims that this improves productivity by "making it easy to catch up after a day of meetings". Apart from this, Zulip offers standard features found in collaboration apps like message reactions, message search history, polls, private messaging, group messaging etc. Zulip streams can be private or public – only people invited to a private stream can view messages in it, while anyone within an organization can join a public stream. Messages in Zulip can be sent in plain-text or formatted using Markdown, along with images, links, and file attachments. Zulip also offers support for native integrations with hundreds of services, which can extend its functionality.

== Official client apps ==
Apart from the web interface, Zulip officially supports other clients, all of which are open sourced:

- Mobile apps for iOS and Android.
- A desktop client for Windows, macOS, and Linux.
- A terminal client for Linux, macOS, and Windows (WSL).

== See also ==
- List of collaborative software
