= Karen Sandler =

American lawyer in free software

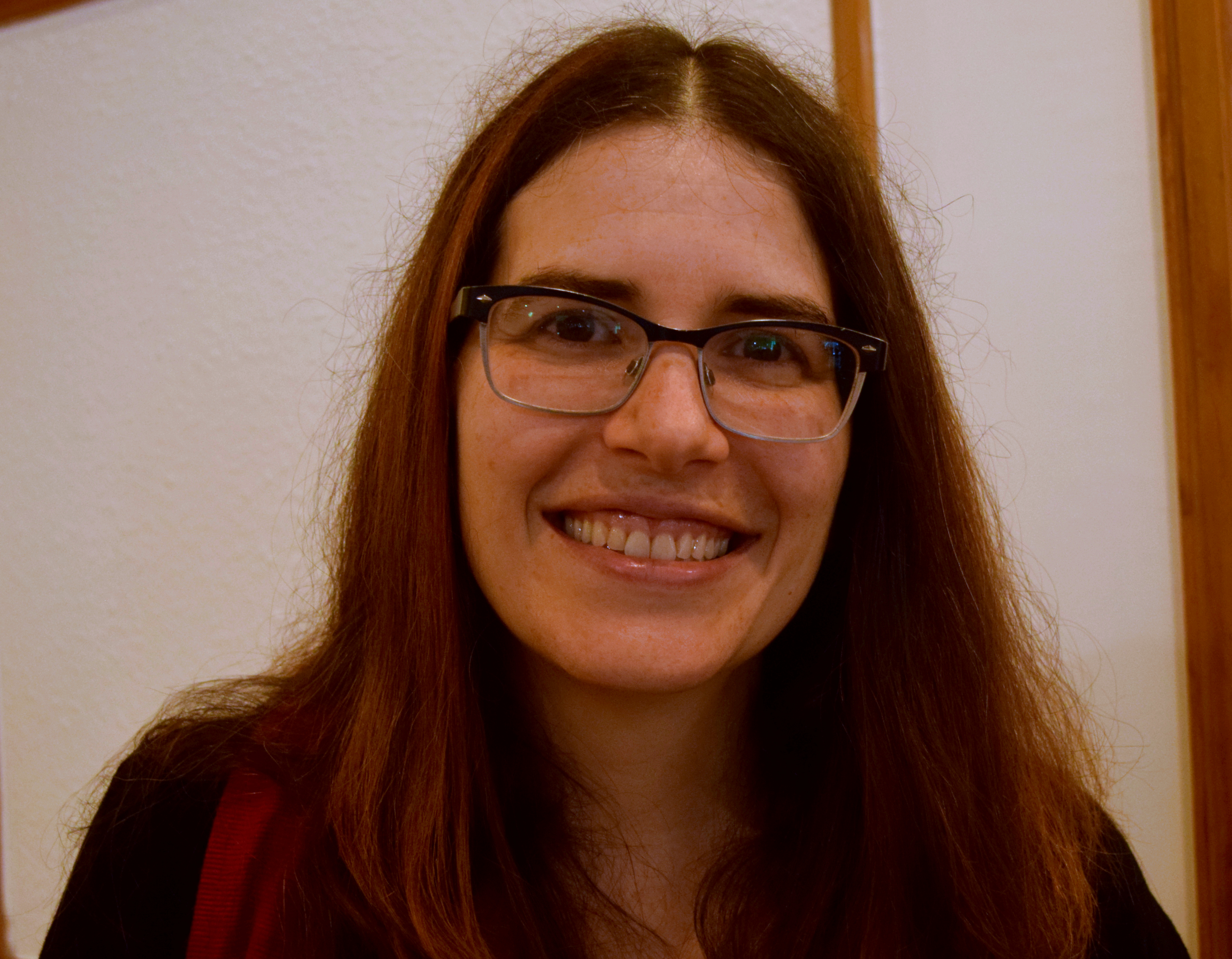
- Karen Sandler at Swathanthra 2017 in Thiruvananthapuram.
- Occupations: Executive Director, Software Freedom Conservancy
- Website: punkrocklawyer.com

Karen Sandler is the executive director of the Software Freedom Conservancy, former executive director of the GNOME Foundation, an attorney, and former general counsel of the Software Freedom Law Center. She holds an honorary doctorate from KU Leuven.

== Work in Free Software ==
As of March 2014, Sandler is executive director of the Software Freedom Conservancy.

From June 2011 to March 2014, Sandler served as executive director of the GNOME Foundation. Under her leadership, GNOME embarked on an ambitious project to draw more women into Free and Open Source software, the Outreach Program for Women.

Between October 31, 2005 and June 21, 2011, she worked at the Software Freedom Law Center (SFLC), first as counsel, and then as the organization's General Counsel after January 6, 2010.

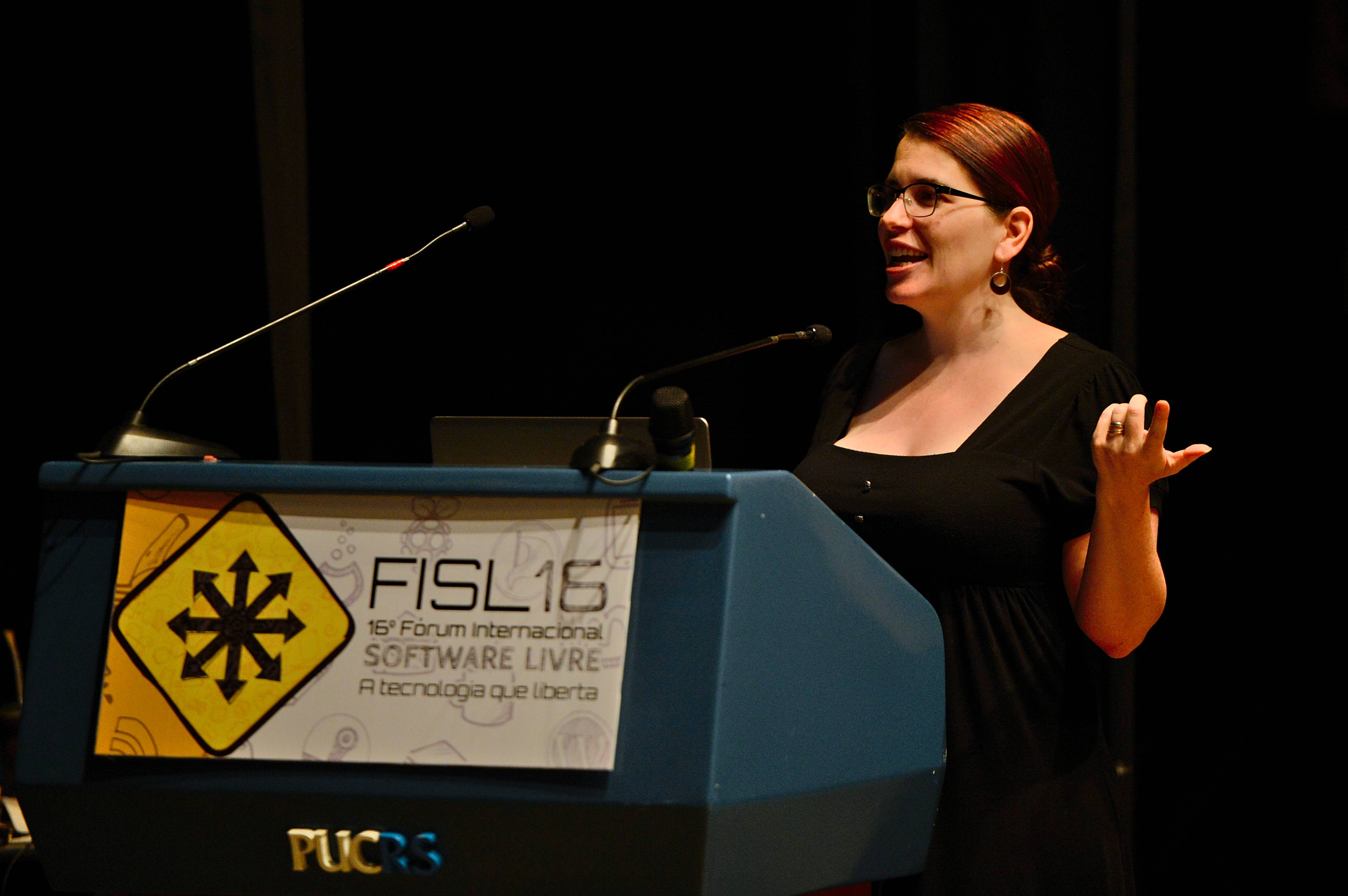
Karen Sandler at FISL 16

While at the SFLC, Sandler advised a wide range of free and open source software organizations such as the Free Software Foundation, the Apache Software Foundation, the X.Org Foundation, Software in the Public Interest and the Software Freedom Conservancy. With SFLC, she became a public speaker about issues of Free and Open Source software at conferences such as OSCON, SCaLE, and LinuxCon. In 2010, she led an initiative advocating for free software on implantable medical devices after exploring the issues surrounding the software on her own implanted medical device (a defibrillator), which regulates hypertrophic cardiomyopathy (HCM), an inherited heart condition.

In addition to her work with the Software Freedom Conservancy, Sandler also served as general counsel (pro bono) of the non-profit Question Copyright. She is also co-host of the "Software Freedom Law Show" (2008-2010) and "Free as in Freedom" (2010-) podcasts.

Sandler received the 2017 Free Software Award for her work promoting software freedom.

In 2023 she received an honorary doctorate from KU Leuven for her exceptional dedication to open source applications within medicine, for her relentless drive to make technology better and safer, and her exemplary role within the technology world as a woman and lawyer.

== Prior legal career ==
An interview with Sandler at linux.conf.au 2014, when she worked at the GNOME Foundation.

Before working with the SFLC, Sandler worked as an associate in the corporate departments of Gibson, Dunn & Crutcher LLP in New York and Clifford Chance in New York and London.

== Education ==
Sandler received her law degree from Columbia Law School in 2000, where she was a James Kent Scholar and co-founder of the Columbia Science and Technology Law Review. She received her bachelor's degree in engineering from The Cooper Union.

== Personal life ==
As of May 21, 2011, she is married to Mike Tarantino, a Grammy nominated music engineer. Their wedding invitation, a working paper record player and playable record, was covered by a number of internet publications. The record contained a song Here's the Invitation! that Sandler and Tarantino made together.
