= Sage Sharp =

American software engineer (b. 1985)

- Born: 1985 (age 40–41)
- Other name: Sarah Sharp
- Known for: Linux kernel contributions
- Spouse: Jamey Sharp
- Website: sage.thesharps.us

Sage Sharp (formerly Sarah Sharp) is an American software engineer who has worked on the Linux kernel, including serving on the Linux Foundation's Technical Advisory Board for two years. Sharp is non-binary and uses they/them pronouns.

They began working on the kernel in 2006 as an undergraduate at Portland State University, and later through an Intel undergraduate research grant. Sharp's contributions to the kernel include writing and acting as a maintainer for its USB 3.0 driver. In 2015, they recommended that the Linux project adopt a code of conduct for Linux developers; Linus Torvalds adopted a "code of conflict" instead. Sharp stepped down from direct work on the kernel on 5 October 2015, citing the abrasive communication style and "abusive commentary [on submitted patches]" of the maintainer community.

Sharp was a volunteer co-coordinator of the Outreachy project, and led a team contributing to the Linux kernel for the project's June 2013 internships. Through their consultancy Otter Tech LLC, they work with Outreachy in a paid capacity, providing code of conduct enforcement training and incidence response workshops.

Sharp won the first annual Red Hat Women in Open Source Community Award in 2015 for "efforts in improving communications and inviting women into open source communities" and the 2016 O'Reilly Open Source Award for accomplishments in the open source community.

== Early years ==
Sharp grew up in Rainier, Oregon, and attended Portland State University as an undergraduate. While at Portland State University, Sharp worked on the Linux kernel for senior elective credits.

== See also ==
- Coraline Ada Ehmke
- Free software movement
- Linux kernel mailing list
- List of LGBT people from Portland, Oregon
- Valerie Aurora
