= Nuno Pinheiro (artist) =

Portuguese graphic designer (born 1977)

- Born: 1977 (age 48–49)
- Occupation: UI designer
- Employer: Klarälvdalens Datakonsult AB
- Known for: KDE UI designer and Oxygen coordinator
- Website: nuno-icons

Nuno Pinheiro is a Portuguese graphic designer and illustrator. He specializes in iconography, themes and user interface design.

== Biography ==
Pinheiro's works include general illustrations, UI design, Web design, corporate design, as well as other works in creative areas.

Pinheiro started as a civil engineer, but after leaving university he started working on icon design.

He is known in Linux circles for his work in the Oxygen Project. He worked at SUSE where he started to work on the Oxygen Project; after leaving SUSE he moved on to continue his work on Oxygen. where he is the current coordinator. In an interview with Libre Graphics Magazine, he explained the history of the Oxygen Project and how it developed into a design platform with over 2000 icons, wallpapers, sound effects and window styles.

He was responsible for the OpenOffice.org Crystal icon set that can be seen in the open suite. He currently works for Klarälvdalens Datakonsult AB (KDAB) as a UI designer. His computer art is used on KDE computer platforms worldwide, and the Web desktop eyeOS extensively uses work by Pinheiro.
