= Jessica McKellar =

American software developer, engineering manager, and author

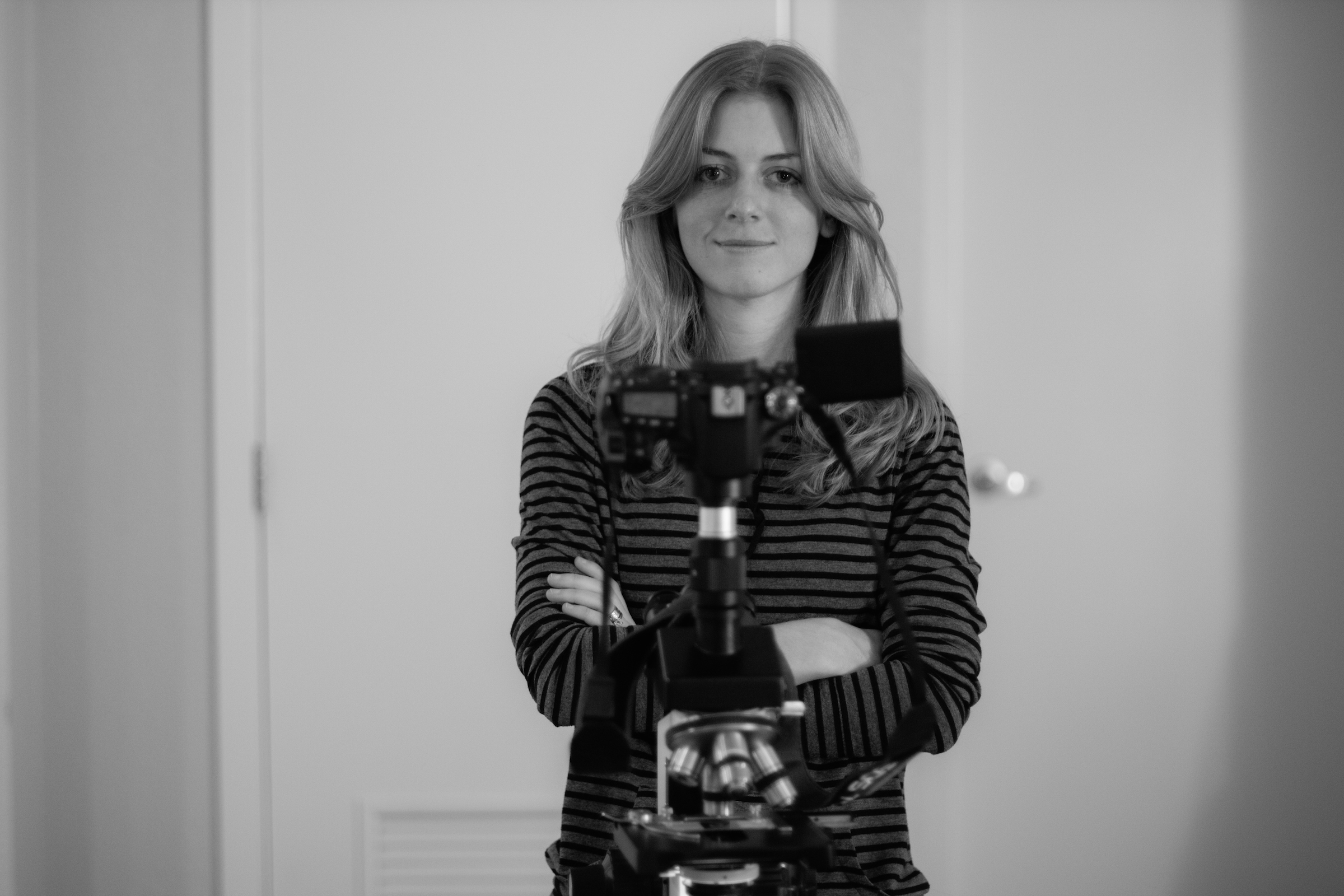
- McKellar in 2015
- Born: 1987 (age 38–39)
- Education: Massachusetts Institute of Technology
- Occupations: Founder and CEO of Pilot.com, Inc., author
- Spouse: Adam Fletcher
- Website: web.mit.edu/jesstess/www/

Jessica Tess McKellar (born 1987) is an American software developer, entrepreneur, and author.

== Education ==
McKellar attended the Massachusetts Institute of Technology and studied computer science and chemistry.

== Work ==
McKellar was an early employee and engineering manager at Ksplice, which was acquired by Oracle in 2011. In 2012, she co-founded Zulip, a chat software company. In 2014, the company was acquired by Dropbox. She has spoken at several conferences about outreach efforts to increase the diversity of open-source communities.

From 2012 to 2014, she was a director of the Python Software Foundation. In 2013, McKellar won the O'Reilly Open Source Award for her contributions to Python. In 2016, she won the Women in Open Source Community Award, awarded by Red Hat. She is a contributor to Twisted, a networking framework for Python. From 2014 to 2017, she was a Director of Engineering and the chief of staff to the VP of Engineering at Dropbox.

McKellar was a senior technical advisor for 16 episodes of the HBO show Silicon Valley.

=== Author ===
McKellar is the co-author of the book Twisted Network Programming Essentials, 2nd Edition (O'Reilly Media - 2013).
