= HacDC =

American nonprofit organization

Coordinates: 38°55′59.29″N 77°2′9.34″W

- Formation: 2008
- Purpose: Hacking
- Location: United States
- Origin: Washington, DC
- Founders: Nick Farr, Adam Koeppel, Andrew "Q" Righter, Alli Rense, Eric Michaud, and volunteers
- Affiliations: Metalab, Chaos Computer Club, NYC Resistor, Noisebridge, DorkbotDC and similar
- Website: www.hacdc.org

HacDC is a hackerspace in Washington, D.C., and a 501(c)(3) nonprofit. According to one member's description, "HacDC members improve the world by creatively rethinking technology. We break, build, and occasionally abuse technology in the pursuit of greater knowledge about how it works and re-purpose it to build new things." In March 2009, its activities were described by The Washington Post. In April 2011, its activities were also mentioned by FastCompany., and NPR's All Tech Considered.

== Membership ==
HacDC encourages participation by anyone who feels they can contribute, and non-members are welcome at the space at any time. All workshops and activities are free, with some exceptions for materials costs, and all are open to the public. As of January 2015, membership stands at 50 people. Dues, which give organizational voting rights, are $60 per month as of January 2015.

HacDC's pool of members brings a wide range of skills an interests to the community—ranging from science, visual and performing arts, electronics and mechanical design. This results in some unusual collaborations among members, some of which have appeared at Washington, DC area art exhibits and performances.

== Physical space ==
As of summer 2025, HacDC is located in the Columbia Heights neighborhood of Washington, DC, in the Tivoli Square building. Previously it was in the office building of St. Stephen and the Incarnation Episcopal Church.

The space is a classroom-workshop for meetings, presentations, classes and electronics projects. It includes tools, a soldering station, electronic diagnostic equipment and several 3D printers. Heavier tools and parts include a drill press, CNC mill, sheet metal bender and optical table. Larger events have occasionally been hosted in the GALA Hispanic Theatre, which is in the same building.

== Activities ==
Some past and present programs and activities include:

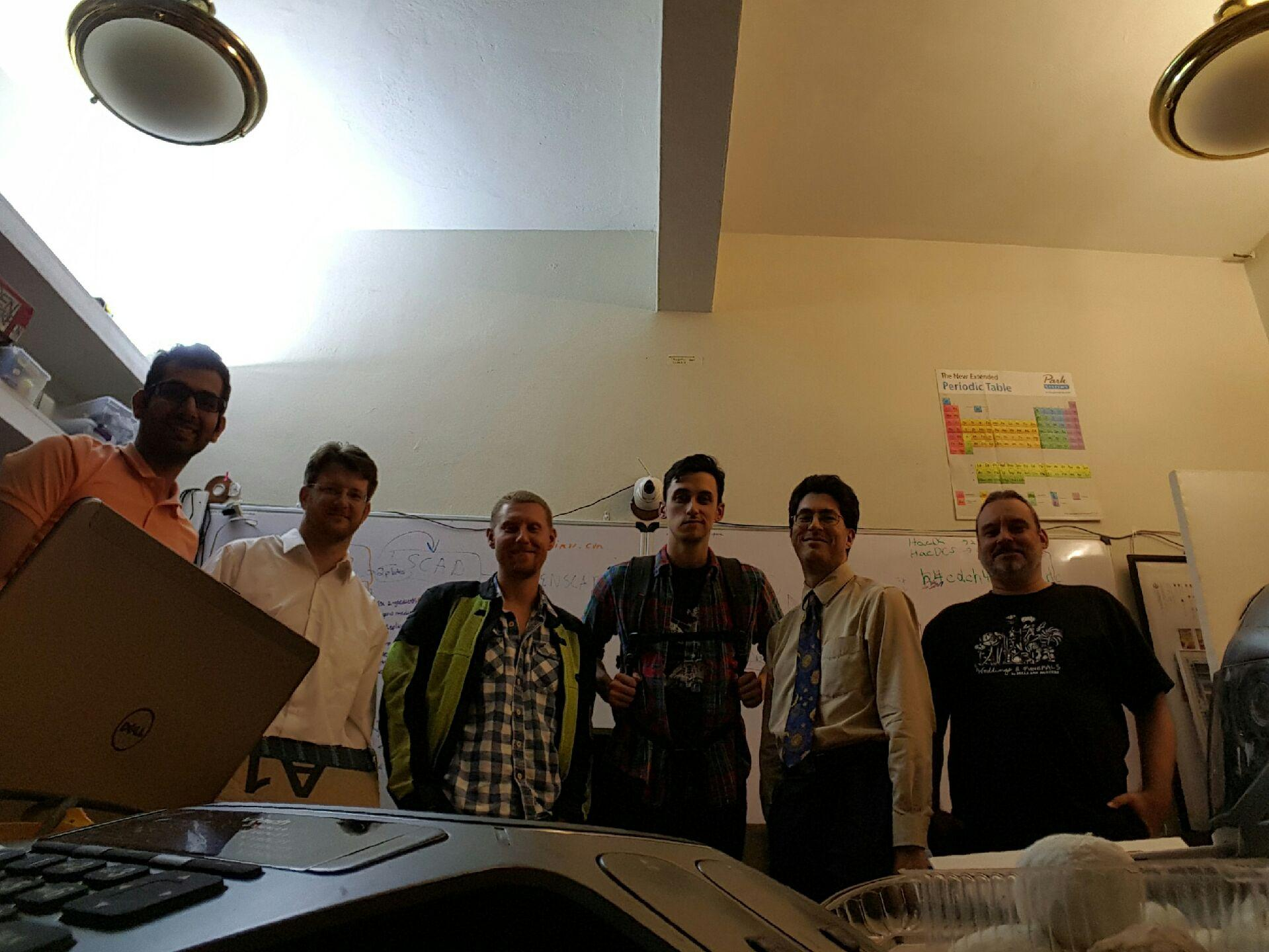

- Microcontroller Workshops and Projects: Microcontroller Mondays, AVR Class
- 3D Printing, printer assembly and repair, 3D part design using ImplicitCAD.
- FPGA Workshops and Projects
- Kit Builds and Kit Designing Nikolas's LED heart kit, Adafruit game of life kit build
- HacDC Lightning Talks
- NARG - Natural Language and AI Research Group
- Gentle Hacker's Literary Salon
- RepRap 3D printer
- HacDC Spaceblimp
- CRISPR-Cas9 bacterial gene editing project.
- Scanning electron microscope refurbishment project.
- The Elements of Computing Systems class
- Bike Maintenance class
- Participating in the Great Global Hackerspace Challenge
- Experimentation with Mobile Ad Hoc Networking

A more updated list can be found on the official calendar.
