= GUADEC =

Annual developer convention

GUADEC logo, used since 2013

Desktop Summit is the convergence of GUADEC and Akademy.

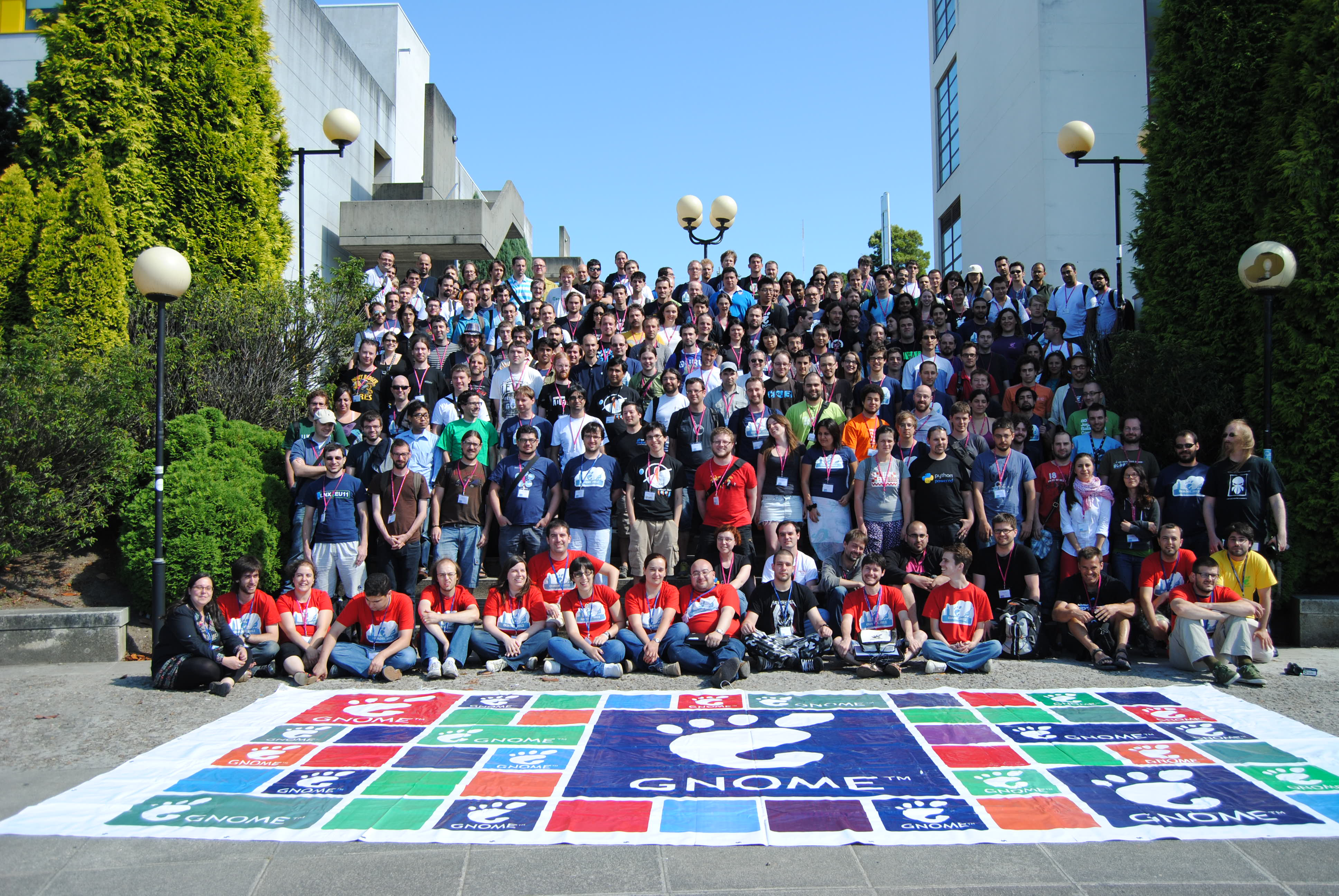
Photography from GUADEC in 2012

GUADEC, formerly the GNOME Users And Developers European Conference, is an annual developer conference whose prime topic is the development of the GNOME desktop environment and its underlying base software such as GTK, GStreamer, etc.

The first GUADEC was organised by Mathieu Lacage as a one-off event and attracted around seventy GNOME contributors. It was the first time many of them had met in person. The conference was judged a success, and has been held annually in different locations since then, organised by local volunteers. The size has increased five-fold since the first conference.

== Conference history ==
Old GUADEC logo, used until 2012

Event	Date	Host city	Venue	Notes	Resources
2000	March 16–18	Paris, France	Ecole Nationale Supérieure des Télécommunications		http://www.guadec.enst.fr/ (archive)
2001	April 6–8	Copenhagen, Denmark	Symbion Science Park		http://guadec.gnome.dk/ (archive)
2002	April 4–6	Seville, Spain	University of Seville		http://www.guadec.org/ (archive)
2003	June 16–18	Dublin, Ireland	Trinity College		http://2003.guadec.org/
2004	June 28–30	Kristiansand, Norway	University of Agder		http://2004.guadec.org/ https://wiki.gnome.org/GUADEC/2004
2005	May 29–31	Stuttgart, Germany	Haus der Wirtschaft		http://2005.guadec.org/ https://wiki.gnome.org/GUADEC/2005
2006	June 24–30	Vilanova i la Geltrú, Spain			https://wiki.gnome.org/GUADEC/2006/Slides https://wiki.gnome.org/GUADEC/2006
2007	July 15–21	Birmingham, United Kingdom	Birmingham Conservatoire		https://wiki.gnome.org/GUADEC/2007/Slides https://wiki.gnome.org/GUADEC/2007
2008	July 7–12	Istanbul, Turkey	Bahçeşehir University		https://wiki.gnome.org/GUADEC/2008/Slides https://wiki.gnome.org/GUADEC/2008
2009	July 3–11	Gran Canaria, Spain	Auditorio Alfredo Kraus	"Gran Canaria Desktop Summit", co-located with KDE Akademy	https://web.archive.org/web/20100918123345/http://www.grancanariadesktopsummit.org/ https://wiki.gnome.org/GUADEC/2009
2010	July 24–30	The Hague, Netherlands	Haagse Hogeschool		https://web.archive.org/web/20140308195809/http://2010.guadec.org/ https://wiki.gnome.org/GUADEC/2010
2011	August 6–12	Berlin, Germany	Humboldt University of Berlin	"Desktop Summit" No2, co-located with KDE Akademy	http://desktopsummit.org/ https://wiki.gnome.org/GUADEC/2011
2012	July 26 – August 1st	A Coruña, Spain	University of A Coruña		http://2012.guadec.org/ https://wiki.gnome.org/GUADEC/2012
2013	August 1–8	Brno, Czech Republic	Brno University of Technology		http://videos.guadec.org/2013/ https://wiki.gnome.org/GUADEC/2013
2014	July 26 – August 1st	Strasbourg, France	University of Strasbourg		https://wiki.gnome.org/GUADEC/2014
2015	August 7–12	Gothenburg, Sweden	Folkets Hus and IT University Gothenburg		https://2015.guadec.org
2016	August 15–17	Karlsruhe, Germany	Karlsruhe Institute of Technology		https://2016.guadec.org YouTube GUADEC 2016 playlist
2017	July 28 – August 2	Manchester, England	Manchester Metropolitan University		https://2017.guadec.org
2018	July 6–11	Almería, Spain	University of Almería		https://2018.guadec.org
2019	August 23–28	Thessaloniki, Greece	University of Macedonia		https://2019.guadec.org
2020	August 22–28	Online only			https://events.gnome.org/event/1/
2021	July 21–25	Online only			https://events.gnome.org/event/9/
2022	July 20–25	Guadalajara, Mexico and Online	Guadalajara Connectory		https://events.gnome.org/event/77/
2023	July 26–31	Riga, Latvia	University of Latvia Academic Center		https://events.gnome.org/event/101/
2024	July 19–24	Denver, United States	Tivoli Student Union		https://events.gnome.org/event/209/
2025	July 24–29	Brescia, Italy	Università degli Studi di Brescia		https://events.gnome.org/event/259/
2026	July 16–21	A Coruña, Spain	University of A Coruña		https://events.gnome.org/event/306/

== See also ==
- List of free-software events
- Libre Application Summit
