= List of free and open-source software organizations =

The following are notable organizations devoted to the advocacy, legal aid, financial aid, technical aid, governance, etc. of free and open-source software (FOSS) as a whole, or of one or more specific FOSS projects. For projects that have their own foundation or are part of an umbrella organization, the primary goal is often to provide a mechanism to fund development of the software.

Most of these groups are structured as nonprofit–charity organizations.

This list includes no businesses that aim to make money from free and open-source software.

== Location-specific ==
=== Arab world ===
- Ma3bar – a United Nations-affiliated organization, promotes open source software within the Arab world.

=== Asia ===
- Free Software Movement of India – founded 2010; a coalition of organizations that advocate use of free software within India.
  - Regional movements
    - Democratic Alliance of Knowledge Front, Kerala (DAKF)
    - Free Software Movement of Delhi/NCR
    - Free Software Movement of Karnataka (FSMK)
    - Free Software Movement of Maharashtra (FSMM)
    - Free Software Movement of Rajasthan
    - Free Software Foundation Tamilnadu (FSFTN)
    - Free Software Movement of West Bengal
    - Swadhin, Odisha
    - Swecha, Telangana & Andhra Pradesh
  - Sectoral movements
    - Appropriate Technology Promotion Society
    - Knowledge Commons
    - National Consultative Committee of Computer Teachers Association (NCCCTA)
    - Open Source Geospatial Foundation India (OSGEO India)
- Free Software Foundation of India – founded 2001
- International Center for Free and Opensource Software (ICFOSS) – founded 2011; an autonomous organization set up by the Government of Kerala, India for free and open source software.
- International Open Source Network (IOSN) – existed 2004–2006; promoted use of open-source software in Asia.
- Open Source Alliance of Central Asia – founded 2011; advocates for use of open source software in Central Asia.
- Hamakor – founded 2003; promotes use of free and open-source software in Israel.
- FOSS United – founded 2020.

=== Australia ===
- Open Source Industry Australia – founded 2004; promotes open source in Australia, and use of Australian open source software and services around the world.

=== Europe ===
- Free Software Foundation Europe – founded 2001
- OpenForum Europe – founded 2002; advocates for use of open source software in Europe.
- Open Technologies Alliance (GFOSS) – founded 2008; promotes use of open-source software, open hardware, open data and content in education, in government and the private sector, at all levels, in Greece and cooperates closely with similar organizations in Europe and worldwide.
- Open Source Observatory and Repository – a project launched by the European Commission, to support the distribution and re-use of software developed by or for public sector administrations across Europe
- April – founded 1996; promotes free software in the French-speaking world.
- Associação Nacional para o Software Livre – founded 2001; promotes use of free software in Portugal.
- Digital Freedom Foundation (DFF) – founded 2004; organizes Software and other Freedom Days
- "Ceata" Foundation, Romania - officially founded in 2013, but active since 2008 as an informal group
- "ProLinux" Association, Romania - founded in 2009
- "ROSEdu" Association, Romania
- "Informatica la Castel" Free Software Summer School, Arad, Romania - founded in 2003
- Open Source Business Alliance, Germany.

=== North America ===
- Free Software Foundation (FSF) – founded 1985; began as a development center for the GNU Project. It currently advocates for free software and against proprietary software and formats; and maintains and legally enforces the GNU General Public License. It also created the Free Software Definition.
- Open Source Initiative (OSI) – founded 1998; promotes open source software from a pragmatic rather than moral perspective. Also created the Open Source Definition.
- Open Source for America (OSFA) – a consortium of organizations advocating for use of FOSS in the United States.
  - Mil-OSS – founded 2009; promotes use of open-source software in the United States Department of Defense.
- Open Source Software Institute (OSSI) – founded 2000; promotes use of open-source software in the United States within government, at all levels.
- Fairfield Programming Association (FPA) – founded 2020; focused on education and creating open-source software as learning resources.

=== South America ===
- Free Software Foundation Latin America – founded 2005
- Fundación Vía Libre – founded 2000; advocates digital rights and use of free software in Latin America, especially within government.

=== Oceania ===
- New Zealand Open Source Society – founded 2003; promotes use of open-source software in New Zealand.
- Free Software Initiative of Japan – founded 2002; supports free software within Japan

== Umbrella organizations ==
The following organizations host, and provide other services, for a variety of different open-source projects:

- Apache Software Foundation (ASF) – founded 1999 with headquarters in Wakefield, MA, USA; manages development of over 350 Apache software projects, including the Apache HTTP Server.
- Center for the Cultivation of Technology - founded 2016 in Germany, headquarters in Berlin; hosts a variety of projects.
- Eclipse Foundation – founded 2004 with headquarters in Brussels, Belgium; supports development of over 350 Eclipse projects, including the Eclipse IDE.
- Free Software Foundation (FSF) – founded 1985 with headquarters in Boston, MA, USA; supports the free software movement, which promotes the universal freedom to study, distribute, create, and modify computer software
- GNOME Foundation – founded 2000 with headquarters in Orinda, CA, USA; coordinates the efforts of the GNOME Project, primarily the GNOME desktop environment & ecosystem.
- KDE e.V. – founded 1997 with headquarters in Berlin, Germany; coordinates efforts of KDE Projects including KDE
- Linux Foundation (LF) – founded 2000 with headquarters in San Francisco, CA, USA; supports development of the Linux kernel, and over 60 other projects, only some of which are connected to Linux, and advocacy, training, and standards.
  - Cloud Native Computing Foundation (CNCF) – founded 2015, to promote cloud-native computing. It was announced with Kubernetes 1.0, an open source container orchestration system, which was contributed to the foundation by Google as a seed technology.
- OASIS Open - founded in 1993; provides communities with foundation-level support, IP and license management, governance, and outreach with an optional path for work to be recognized by de jure standards organizations and referenced in public procurement.
- OpenInfra Foundation – founded 2012 with headquarters in Austin, TX; focused on the development and support of open source infrastructure projects, including OpenStack. Previously known as the OpenStack Foundation.
- OW2 – founded 2007 with headquarters in Paris, France; focused on infrastructure for enterprise middleware
- Open Source Initiative (OSI) – founded 1998 with headquarters in Palo Alto, CA, USA; steward of the Open Source Definition, a foundational policy document of the open-source software movement
- Sahana Software Foundation – founded 2009 with headquarters in Los Angeles, CA, USA; for humanitarian-related software
- Software Freedom Conservancy – founded 2006 with headquarters in New York, NY, USA; hosts around 40 projects.
- Software in the Public Interest (SPI) – founded 1997 with headquarters in New York, NY, USA; originally only for the Debian project, it now hosts around 35 projects, some of which are umbrella projects themselves.
- VideoLAN – founded 2009 with headquarters in Paris, France; multimedia-related projects

== Domain-specific organizations ==
The following organizations host open-source projects that relate to a specific technical area.

- freedesktop.org – founded 2000; hosted by SPI since 2015. Hosts around 25 projects, mostly related to the X Window System.
- Hugging Face – founded 2016; develops and hosts open-source machine learning and artificial intelligence projects.
- Open Bioinformatics Foundation – founded 2001; hosted by SPI since 2012. Hosts around 10 bioinformatics projects.
- Open Source Geospatial Foundation – founded 2006; hosts roughly 25 projects related to geospatial technology.
- Open Source Security Foundation – founded 2020
- OSADL – founded 2005; supports development of various projects, mostly Linux-based, for the machine tool and automation industries.
- Xiph.Org Foundation – founded 1994 as the "Xiphophorus Company"; became a non-profit under its current name in 2003. Directly develops, and supports outside development of, multimedia-related software and formats.

== Project-specific organizations ==
A large number of single-project organizations (often called "foundations") exist; in most cases, their primary purpose is to provide a mechanism to bring funds from the software's users, including both individuals and companies, to its developers.

- .NET Foundation – founded 2014; supports development of open-source projects around the .NET framework.
- Alliance for Open Media – founded 2015; attempting to develop a royalty-free video format.
- AlmaLinux OS Foundation – founded 2021; owns and manages everything to do with the open source operating system AlmaLinux.
- Blender Foundation – founded 2002; supports development of the computer graphics software Blender.
- Center for Open Science – The Open Science Framework is a software project that facilitates open collaboration in science
- CE Linux Forum – founded 2003; supports development of Linux for consumer electronics devices.
- Common Lisp Foundation
- Django Software Foundation – founded 2008; supports development of the web framework Django.
- The Document Foundation – founded 2012; supports development of the office suite LibreOffice.
- Drupal Association – founded 2009; advocates for the Drupal content management system, including running the DrupalCon conference.
- F# Software Foundation – founded 2013; supports development of the F# programming language.
- Firebird Foundation – founded 2002; supports development of the relational database Firebird.
- FreeBSD Foundation – founded 2001; supports development of the operating system FreeBSD.
- GNOME Foundation – founded 2000; coordinates development of the GNOME desktop environment.
- GrapheneOS Foundation – founded 2023; supports development of the privacy- and security-focused mobile operating system GrapheneOS.
- KDE e.V. – founded 1997; supports development of desktop applications by the KDE community.
- Krita Foundation – founded 2013; supports development of the Krita digital painting application.
- Kuali Foundation – founded 2005; develops the Kuali family of enterprise resource planning software for higher education institutions.
- MariaDB Foundation – founded 2012; supports development of MariaDB Server and related advocacy.
- Mozilla Foundation – founded 2003; supports and manages development of the Mozilla project, in conjunction with the Mozilla Corporation, a for-profit company it owns.
- NetBSD Foundation – founded 1995; supports development of the operating system NetBSD.
- Open Invention Network – founded 2005; acquires patent non-assertion promises from its members towards other organization members, focused on Linux
- OpenBSD Foundation – founded 2007; supports development of the operating system OpenBSD and its utilities.
- OpenStreetMap Foundation – founded 2006; supports development of the OpenStreetMap mapping software.
- Perl Foundation – founded 2000; supports development of the Perl programming language, including running Yet Another Perl Conference.
- Plone Foundation – founded 2004; supports development of the Plone web content management system.
- Python Software Foundation – founded 2001; supports development of the Python programming language.
- The Rosetta Foundation – founded 2009; develops the Service-Oriented Localisation Architecture Solution.
- Rails Foundation – founded 2022; supports and advocates for the community using the web framework Ruby on Rails.
- Ruby Central – founded 2002; supports and advocates for use of the Ruby programming language.
- Rust Foundation - founded in 2021; supports the Rust programming language and ecosystem, with a unique focus on supporting the set of maintainers that govern and develop the project.
- Sahana Software Foundation – founded 2009; develops the Sahana suite of disaster and emergency management software.
- Signal Foundation – founded 2018; supports development of the encrypted communication application Signal.
- SIPfoundry – founded 2004; develops the sipXecs communication system, and related advocacy.
- Sourcefabric – founded 2010 as a spinoff from the Media Development Investment Fund; develops software for independent news media organizations.
- Symbian Foundation – existed 2008–2011; supported development of the discontinued Symbian operating system.
- VideoLAN – founded 2009; supports development of the VLC media player and related software.
- Wikimedia Foundation - founded in 2003; develops MediaWiki and hosts related websites, such as the English Wikipedia
- X.Org Foundation – founded 2004; hosted by SPI since 2014. Does funding and advocacy related to the X Window System.
- XMPP Standards Foundation – founded 2001 as the Jabber Software Foundation; renamed in 2007. Supports development around the XMPP communication protocol.
- Zope Foundation – founded 2006; it promotes development of the Zope platform by supporting the community that develops and maintains the relevant software components.

== Cause-specific ==
- Ada Initiative – existed 2011–2015; advocated the participation of women in FOSS development.
- PyLadies – founded 2011; advocates for female participation in the Python community.

== Legal aid ==
- IfrOSS – founded 2015; provides legal services for free software in Germany.
- Software Freedom Law Center – founded 2005; provides free legal representation and other legal services to not-for-profit FOSS projects.

== User groups ==
- GNU/Linux Users Groups
- Linux user group – the general term for organizations of Linux users; see Category:Linux user groups.

== See also ==
- Khronos Group – standards for 3D graphics, virtual reality, augmented reality, parallel computation, and machine learning.
- List of Apache Software Foundation projects
- List of Eclipse projects
- List of free and open-source software packages
