= Net neutrality in India =

Mechanisms for establishing rules ensuring net neutrality in India, are at present mainly enforced by the Telecom Regulatory Authority of India (TRAI). At present, there are no specific legislation regarding Net Neutrality in India.

On 12 July 2018, The Department of Telecommunications made rules, approving the recommendations from TRAI, which heavily favoured net neutrality in India. These rules barred any form of data discrimination. Internet service providers which violate these rules may have their licenses cancelled. The rules make an exception for "critical IoT services" or "specialized services" such as autonomous vehicles and remote surgery operations.

The debate on network neutrality in India gained public attention in December 2014, after Airtel, a mobile telephony service provider in India, announced additional charges for making voice calls (VoIP) from its network using apps like WhatsApp, Skype, etc. More recently, the spectacular rise of Reliance Jio and the reduction in the total number of Internet service providers to three has raised concerns regarding the market moving towards a monopoly. Such a transformation could have serious implications for net neutrality in the country.

In March 2015, TRAI released a formal consultation paper on Regulatory Framework for Over-the-top (OTT) services, seeking comments from the public. The consultation paper was criticised for being one sided and having confusing statements. It received condemnation from various politicians and Indian Internet users. The last date for submission of comment was 24 April 2015 and TRAI received over a million emails.

On 8 February 2016, TRAI passed the "Prohibition of Discriminatory Tariffs for Data Services Regulations, 2016", prohibiting telecom service providers from levying discriminatory rates for data. This move was welcomed by millions of Indians and also by people from other countries who are fighting or fought for net neutrality, and the inventor of the World Wide Web, Tim Berners Lee.

== History ==
=== 2006-2013 ===
In 2006, TRAI invited opinions regarding the regulation of net neutrality from various telecom industry bodies and stakeholders. Specifically, in December 2006, a consultation paper published by TRAI noted that even though the Internet had been neutral since 1998 when private ISPs were allowed to begin operations, the situation might change in the future. Internet service providers may discriminate against competing applications and content providers. This may affect services like Internet telephony. The paper invited opinions from stakeholders on whether regulatory intervention was required or whether it should be left to market forces.

In February 2012, at the World Mobile Congress held in Barcelona, the CEO of Bharti Airtel, Sunil Bharti Mittal suggested that services like YouTube should pay an interconnect charge to network operators, saying that if telecom operators are building highways for data then there should be a tax on the highway. In July 2012, Bharti Airtel's Director of Network Services, Jagbir Singh suggested that large Internet companies like Facebook and Google should share revenues with telecom companies. According to him, Internet companies were making big profits from small investments, whereas the telecom companies were actually investing in building networks. He also suggested that the telecom regulator should establish interconnection charges for data services, similar to those applied to voice calls. In August 2012, The Hindu reported that according to data from M-Lab, You Broadband, Airtel, and BSNL were throttling BitTorrent traffic.

In February 2013, Killi Kruparani, Union Minister of State for Communications and Information Technology, said that the government would look into the legality of VoIP services. The Chief General Manager of the state-run BSNL, V. Srinivasan also said that services like Skype are illegal. In June 2013, Bharti Airtel began offering certain Google services for free to its cellular broadband users, with a limit of 1GB on the free data.

=== 2014 ===
In February 2014, Gopal Vittal, CEO of Airtel's India operations, said that companies offering free messaging apps like Skype, Line and WhatsApp should be regulated similar to telecom operators. In August 2014, TRAI rejected a proposal from telecom companies to make messaging application firms share part of their revenue with the carriers or the government. In October 2014, Vodafone India CEO Marten Pieters suggested that companies like Facebook and WhatsApp should be taxed to ensure a level playing field with telecom operators. In November 2014, TRAI began investigating if Airtel was implementing preferential access by offering special Internet packs which allowed WhatsApp and Facebook data at rates which were lower than its standard data rates.

In December 2014, Airtel changed its service terms for 2G and 3G data packs so that VoIP data was excluded from the set amount of free data. A standard data charge of ₹0.04 per 10 KB for 3G service and ₹0.1 per 10 KB (more than ₹10,000 for 1GB) for 2G service was levied on VoIP data. A few days later Airtel announced a separated Internet pack for VoIP apps, it offered 75 MB for ₹75 with a validity of 28 days. The TRAI chief Rahul Khullar said that Airtel cannot be held responsible for violating net neutrality because India has no regulation that demands net neutrality. Airtel's move faced criticism on social networking sites like Facebook, Twitter and Reddit. Later on 29 December 2014, Airtel announced that it would not be implementing planned changes, pointing out that there were reports that TRAI would be soon releasing a consultation paper on the issue.

Rahul Khullar, TRAI chairman, said that what Airtel tried to do was against net neutrality, but not illegal, as India had no law enforcing net neutrality. He added that TRAI was preparing a consultation paper on regulating OTT services to level the playing field. OTT firms will have to apply for licenses and share revenue with the government.

=== 2015 ===
On 10 February 2015, Facebook launched Internet.org in India with Reliance Communications. It aims to provide free access to 38 websites through an app. Only Bing was made available as the search engine. Sunil Mittal, CEO of Bharti Airtel, criticised the concept and said, "If you are going to make the data free, then let's do completely philanthropic projects. Government must make spectrum free, there should be free network, but it is not happening."

In April 2015, Airtel announced the "Airtel Zero" scheme. Under the scheme, app firms sign a contract and Airtel provides the apps for free to its customers. The reports of Flipkart, an e-commerce firm, joining the "Airtel Zero" scheme drew negative response. People began to give the one-star rating to its app on Google Play. Following the protests Flipkart decided to pull out of Airtel Zero. The e-commerce firm confirmed the news in an official statement on 14 April, saying, "We will be walking away from the ongoing discussions with Airtel for their platform Airtel Zero".

However, The Indian government could block zero rating plans such as Airtel Zero and internet.org in view of net neutrality.

The old Communication and Information Technology Minister, Ravi Shankar Prasad, on 7 April said that a committee will be formed to study the net neutrality issue. Rajeev Chandrasekhar, a Member of the Parliament, had also supported net neutrality. The Competition Commission of India (CCI) chairman, Ashok Chawla, said that they were examining whether these practices were unfair. Later on 10 May, a CCI official said that they were waiting for final regulations from TRAI. The Department of Telecommunication also said that they were investigating the matter.

==== TRAI's consultation paper ====
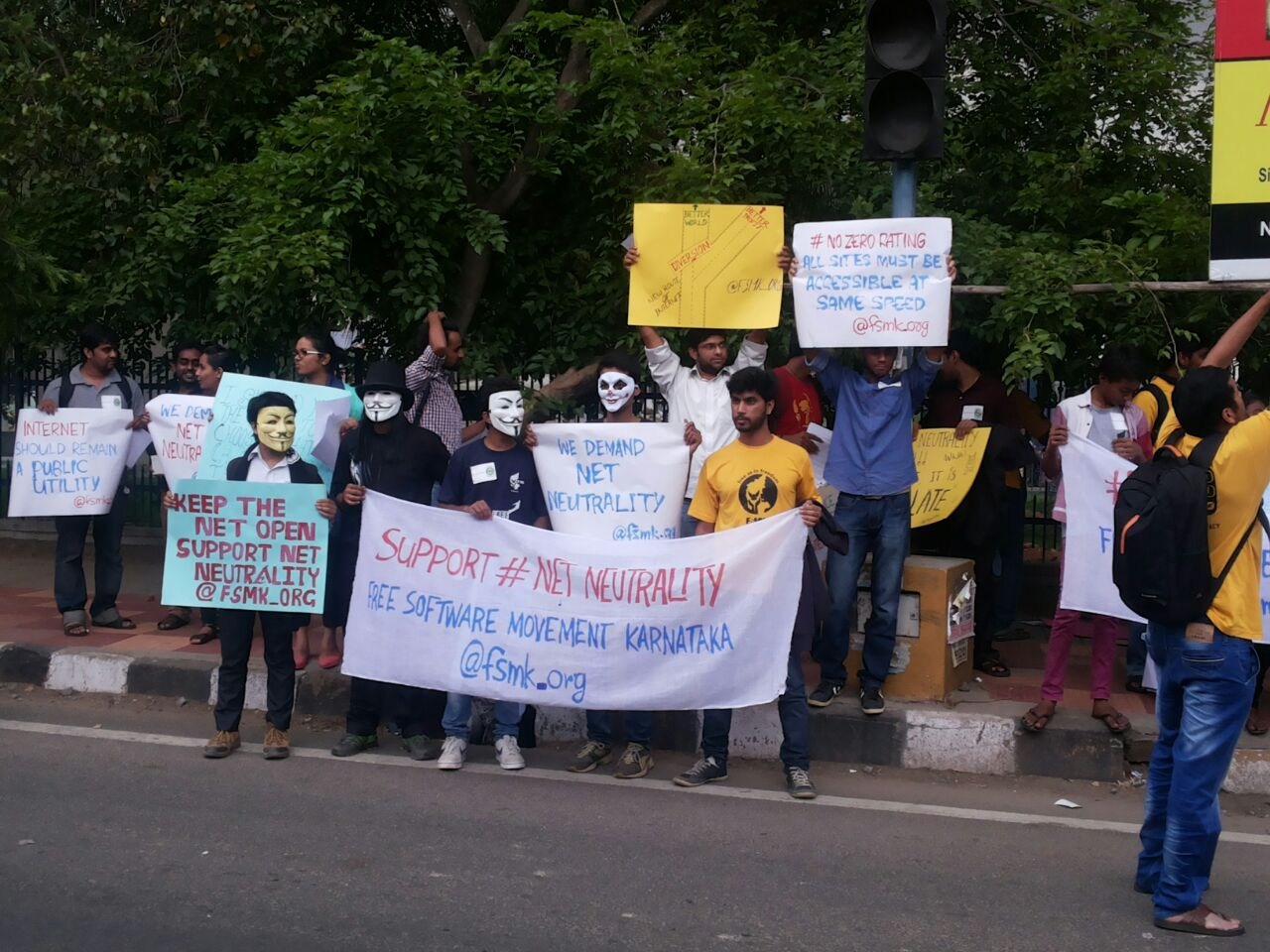
Demonstration by the Free Software Movement of Karnataka in support of net neutrality; April 2015.

On 27 March 2015, TRAI released a consultation paper on over-the-top services (OTT) and net neutrality for public feedback. On 7 April 2015, the Member of the Parliament from Odisha, Tathagata Satpathy, wrote an open letter to TRAI in support of net neutrality. On 16 April, the Chief Minister of Odisha, Naveen Patnaik, also wrote an open letter to TRAI supporting net neutrality. Other politicians who came out in support of net neutrality were Rahul Gandhi, Rajeev Chandrasekhar, Ajay Maken, and Tarun Vijay.

On 11 April 2015, a YouTube comedy channel All India Bakchod uploaded a video titled "Save The Internet" which urged people to email TRAI demanding net neutrality. The video was re-shared on Twitter by numerous times, including by some Indian actors. Cleartrip.com, the Times Group, NewsHunt and NDTV pulled out of the Facebook initiated Internet.org expressing their support for net neutrality. However, Mark Zuckerberg defended Internet.org in an interview to Hindustan Times saying, "Net neutrality is not in conflict with working to get more people connected. We will never prevent people accessing other services, and we will not use fast lanes."

On 23 April 2015, various organizations under the ambit of Free Software Movement of India organized protests in various cities across India. Free Software Foundation Tamil Nadu organized a protest march at Besant Nagar Beach. Free Software Movement of Karnataka organized a protest march from National Games Village to Forum Mall in Bangalore.

The Cellular Operators Association of India (COAI) launched a counter campaign called Sabka Internet, Sab ka Vikas. It claimed that COAI members aim to connect the unconnected citizens of India and demanded that VoIP apps should treated as cellular operators. The cellular operators send SMS messages to consumers, asking them to give them a missed call if they support their demands. On 3 May 2015, they claimed that they gather 4 million supporters in this manner.

The last date for submission of comments was 24 April 2015 and TRAI received over a million emails. On 27 April 2015, members of the Anonymous India group claimed that they had taken down TRAI's official website, trai.gov.in, using a DDoS attack in retaliation for TRAI's release of PDF files containing the names and emails of more than a million people who commented on the "Regulatory Framework for OTT services" paper. However, officials from the IT Ministry could not confirm it and said the website was down most likely due to high traffic. TRAI was criticized for violating the privacy of the respondents by making their emails public along with email ids, as it exposed them to the wide internet thus potentially grabbing eyeballs of spammers.

Facebook's proposed Free Basics is a new avatar of its internet.org initiative which allows customers to access a slew of apps for free. However, activists are pushing back this initiative arguing that with Free Basics, Facebook would become a gatekeeper, deciding who would not be on the Free Basics platform and in the process, make or break fortunes of several startups. As a result, Facebook has challenged the TRAI after releasing its Free Basics zero-rating app “which provides access to a host of Internet services like Wikipedia, the BBC, health sites and weather reports, and, of course, Facebook. The services are lightweight versions of the originals that load quickly and perform well on less robust 2G and 3G networks.” The TRAI blocked Free Basics on the basis that although the service is free, there are specific sites that cannot be accessed unless the consumer pays. Zuckerberg countered this argument by releasing a statement saying, “It’s not an equal Internet if the majority of people can’t participate." Towards the end of 2015, the TRAI temporarily banned Facebook’s “Free Basics” zero rating app for an undisclosed time. However, in a recent article, it is clear the TRAI has taken a stand supporting net neutrality after giving thought to both sides of the debate with the help of the consultation papers addressing the issue.

=== 2016 ===
==== TRAI rules in favor of Net Neutrality ====
The TRAI on 8 February 2016 barred telecom service providers from charging differential rates for data services, thus prohibiting Facebook’s Free Basics and Airtel Zero platform by Airtel in their present form.

In their latest ruling, they have stipulated that:

1. No service provider can offer or charge discriminatory tariffs for data services on the basis of content.
2. No service provider shall enter into any arrangement, agreement or contract, by whatever name called, with any person, natural or legal, that the effect of discriminatory tariffs for data services being offered or charged by the service provider for the purpose of evading the prohibition in this regulation.
3. Reduced tariff for accessing or providing emergency services, or at times of public emergency has been permitted.
4. Financial disincentives for contravention of the regulation have also been specified.
5. TRAI may review these regulations after a period of two years.

In an emailed statement to the press, a Facebook spokesperson said, “While disappointed with the outcome, we will continue our efforts to eliminate barriers and give the unconnected an easier path to the Internet and the opportunities it brings.” Similarly, Mark Zuckerberg said that his colleague's controversial tweet that "Free Basics was same as Colonialism"—Marc Andreessen was "Deeply upsetting"

=== 2017 ===
On 28 November 2017 the TRAI released its recommendations on Net Neutrality. With that, India is one step closer to ensuring that net neutrality is enforced nationwide. Telecom minister Manoj Sinha said on 12 December that the TRAI's recommendations were similar to the views expressed by a DoT committee in 2015 that had also acknowledged the need for net neutrality and suggested allowing for legitimate traffic management. It had, however, disallowed exploitative or anti-competitive traffic management, app-based specific control within the Internet traffic and traffic prioritization on paid basis.

=== 2018 ===
On 14 June 2018, BEREC and TRAI have published a Joint Statement for an Open Internet.

On 11 July 2018, the Department of Telecommunications has approved TRAI recommendations on Net neutrality.

== Legal aspects ==
Since 12 July 2018 Net Neutrality has been in effect in India. These rules ban any form of data discrimination. ISPs which violate these rules can have their licenses cancelled. Though these rules do not apply to "critical IoT services" or "specialized services" such as autonomous vehicles and remote surgery operations.
