= HTC (disambiguation) =

HTC is a Taiwanese manufacturer of smartphones and handheld devices.

HTC may also refer to:

== Organizations ==
=== Companies ===
- Harrisonville Telephone Company, a telephone company in Waterloo, Illinois, US
- HTC Global Services, an American information technology company
- High Tech Campus Eindhoven, Netherlands

=== Colleges ===
- Hangzhou Teachers College, Hangzhou, China
- Harrogate Tutorial College, North Yorkshire, England
- Hebrew Theological College, Skokie, Illinois, US
- Hennepin Technical College, Minnesota, US
- Highland Theological College, Dingwall, Scotland
- Holy Trinity College, Hong Kong, China
- Holy Trinity College, Philippines, in Puerto Princesa City, Palawan, Philippines
- Horndean Technology College, Hampshire, England

== Science and technology ==
- Halley-type comet, a group of short-period comets
- Heat transfer coefficient, in thermodynamics
- High-temperature superconductor, a material
- Hydrothermal carbonization, a process reducing biomass to carbon

=== Computing ===
- High-throughput computing, many computing resources over long periods of time to accomplish tasks
- HTML Components, a mechanism to implement components in script as Dynamic HTML

== Other uses ==
- Hanseatic Trade Center, an office complex in Hamburg, Germany
- Harrisburg Transportation Center, a railway station in Harrisburg, Pennsylvania, US
