= Next-generation network services =

Next-generation network services is a jargon term with no specific meaning. The term is used, in some telecommunication communities, in a loose way to refer to services that have not traditionally been provided by telecommunication operators circuit switched networks. Services include VoIP, IPTV, presence-based applications, instant messaging and location-based services. All of these example services are deployed and used on the Internet or private IP networks and access is available to them from traditional circuit switched networks.

== Standards bodies and industry support forums ==
Various industry forums have emerged to promote as well as standardize the evolving services of next generation networks. These new network services leverage a common IMS core for a horizontal signaling layer.

- Alliance for Telecommunications Industry Solutions (ATIS)
- IPTV Interoperability Forum (IIF)
- Multiservice Forum (MSF)
- IMS/NGN Forum
- SIP Forum

These forums generally host interoperability events in which multiple vendors show that services based on standards promoted by the forums can actually be deployed. They also publish specifications and interoperability agreements in parallel with standards bodies.

== Interoperability events ==
- IMS Forum Plugfests
- SIP Forum's "SIPit" SIP interoperability testing events
- MultiService Forum's biennial Global MSF Interoperatbility (GMI)
