= Girish Bharadwaj =

Indian social worker (1950–2026)

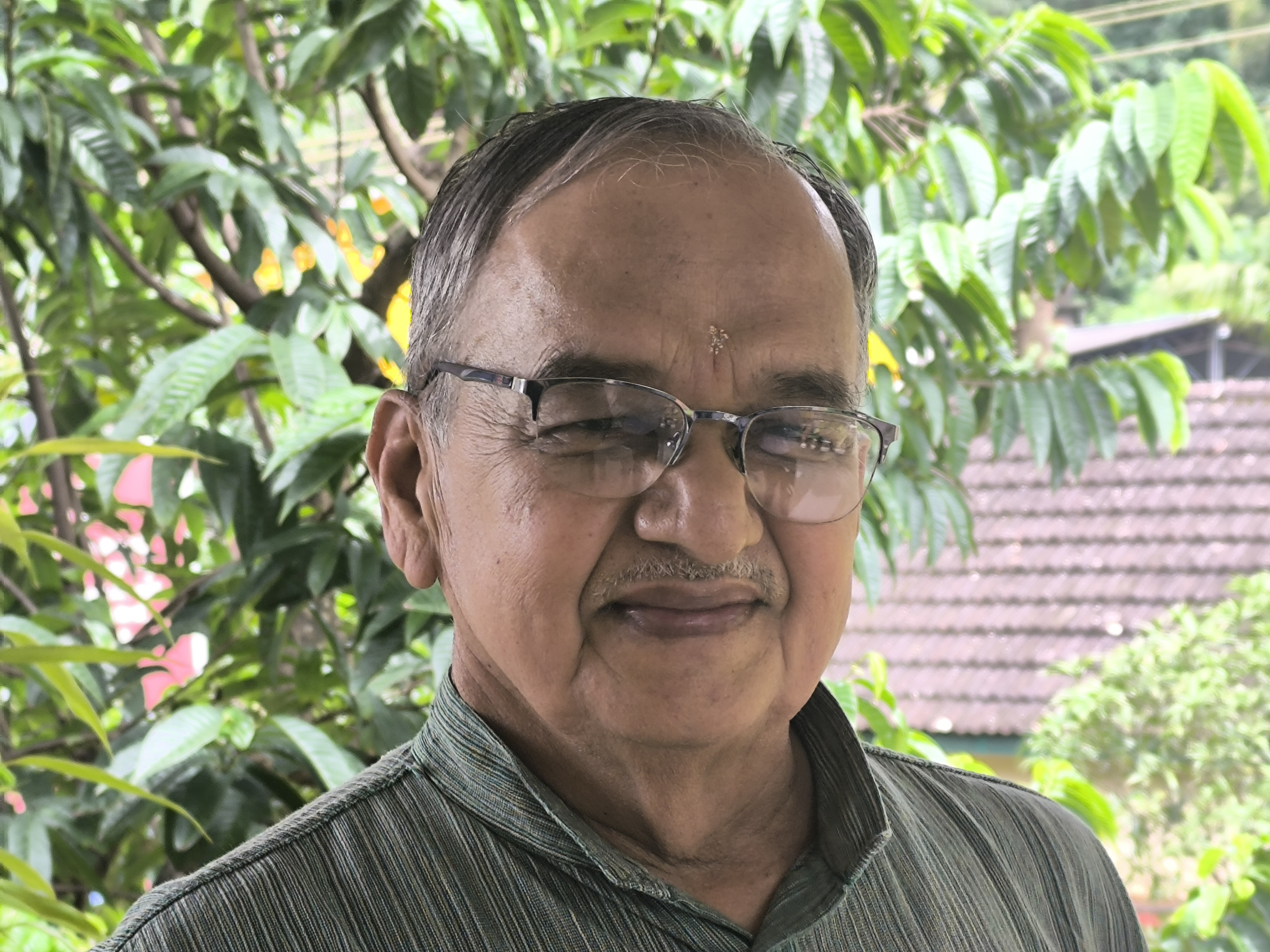
- Born: 2 May 1950; Sullia, Mysore State, India
- Died: 7 July 2026 (aged 76); Sullia, Karnataka, India
- Other names: Sethu Bandhu, Bridgeman of India
- Occupation: Engineer
- Honours: Padma Shri (2017)

Girish Bharadwaj (2 May 1950 – 7 July 2026) was an Indian social worker often referred to as Sethu Bandhu and Bridgeman of India for building around 127 bridges in remote villages across India. He was conferred the Padma Shri award in 2017.

== Background ==
Bharadwaj was born on 2 May 1950, and hailed from Sullia in Karnataka. He graduated with a mechanical engineering degree in 1973 from P.E.S. College of Engineering in Mandya. Bharadwaj and his wife, Usha, had three children.

Bharadwaj died in Sullia on 7 July 2026, at the age of 76.

== Career ==
Bharadwaj built his first bridge in 1989 across the Payaswini river at Arambur in Southern Karnataka. Following that, he built around thirty bridges in Kerala, two each in Telangana and Odisha, while the rest of his works are in various parts of Karnataka.

== Recognition ==
In 2017, Bharadwaj was honoured by the Government of India with Padma Shri, the fourth highest Indian civilian award.
