= FSFI =

Topics referred to by the same term

FSFI may refer to:

- Free Software Foundation of India, an Indian free software advocacy organization
- International Women's Sports Federation (French: Fédération Sportive Féminine Internationale), a former international women's sports federation
- Female Sexual Function Index, a self-report questionnaire for assessing female sexual function
- Federazione fra le Società Filateliche Italiane, the Italian national federation of philatelic societies
