= Gleducar =

Educational open access organization

- Founded: 2001
- Type: Non-profit organization
- Purpose: Promotion of Open Education and Free Knowledge
- Location(s): Rosario, Santa Fe; Argentina
- Members: 550+
- Website: http://www.gleducar.org.ar/

Gleducar is a free educational project emerged in Argentina in 2002. It is also an important NGO (Civil Association) from Argentina in the field of education and technology.

Gleducar is an independent community composed of teachers, students and education activists linked by a common interest in collective work, cooperative knowledge building and free distribution of knowledge.

The project works around different themes, such as Open Education, Open Access, Free Knowledge, Popular Education, peer education, collaborative learning and Free Technologies, and promotes the use of Free Software in schools as a pedagogical and technical system, with the objective of changing the paradigm of production, construction and dissemination of educational content.

It consists of an independent educational community incorporated as a self-organized NGO (Civil Association) which meets the interests and objectives of the community. Gleducar Project is the result of the sum of their community and the NGO that supports it.

== Project objectives ==
- Raise awareness of the educational community about the importance of computers as an educational support tool and as a facilitator in Cooperative Knowledge Building.
- Create a community for sharing ideas, experiences and projects related to the topic of technological integration and use of free software among the various educational institutions, students, teachers and community in Argentina.
- To promote the educational use of Internet in schools as a tool for creative production and research, and as a communication mean for ideas and knowledge.
- Inform to general community and educational community particularly about the benefits offered by GNU / Linux and Free Software as an alternative to other systems with similar characteristics.
- Provide advice to schools and teachers in the area of technological integration and development of real integrating projects.
- Attract computer specialists to the educational community and vice versa, to accomplish the freedom of speech and communicative exchange, transferring the love of learning and challenges that promotes a true shared learning.

== History and development ==
Gleducar Project was born around 2002 in the city of Cañada Rosquín, Santa Fé, Argentina. It was established as a Civil Association in 2004. Today is one of the most important educational projects in Argentina, concerning free education.

Gleducar Project was declared of National Interest by the Senate of Argentina in 2005.

It is recognized worldwide as a benchmark of free education in Latin America. In 2007 it received an Honorable Mention in the International Competition "Chris Nicol" of the Free Software Association for Progressive Communications (APC) for its outstanding work for free and sustainable education.

Gleducar's work has been an inspiration and a guide for the emergence of other similar projects and communities on the continent.

== Actions ==
Gleducar carries out projects to improve computer labs, settled on dozens of migrations to Free Software conducted in schools in Argentina, that have obtained high-quality resources for teaching.

Gleducar community also develops free educational materials in conjunction with other nonprofit organizations and working with the Argentine State. It has a large repository of free educational resources and a wide range of educational free software tools.

Gleducar develops pedagogical and technical skills on collaborative knowledge production, free education and free software.

It regularly organizes two annual events CoLCIT (Congress of Free Culture for Tertiary Institutions) and Epuel (Meeting for a Free Education). It also participates in conferences and local, regional and international meetings on the subject.

It has worked with the Argentinian National Ministry of Education in the development of free educational materials. However, the NGOs does not currently receive financial contributions from any government entity.

Gleducar has also carried out numerous actions in conjunction with the Fundación Vía Libre. It has also developed open source projects and has carried out joint activities with other organizations such as Fairness Foundation, Caritas, CTERA (Confederation of Education Workers of Argentina), AMSAFE, SoLAr, FM La Tribu, CaFeLUG, LUGRo, Tuquito GNU/Linux, Wikimedia Argentina, among others. The project also hosts and promotes other initiatives such as Argenclic, Free University, among others.

Internationally, the project has participated in and acceded to various joint statements on access to knowledge and free / open education as the "Santo Domingo Declaration", the Cape Town Open Education Declaration and the "Charter for innovation, creativity and access to knowledge".

It also works on issues related to the free movement of knowledge, participating alongside other civic organizations on initiatives and campaigns warning about the threat of Intellectual Property regimes for the common cultural heritage, and on mobilizations against policies that victimizes the net neutrality and the freedom of expression on the Internet, on various occasions.

== Resources provided by Gleducar ==
Gleducar provides multiple resources for teachers in particular and to all who wish to undertake free projects related to the C3. The space is provided at no economic cost on the condition of using a free license that -minimally- allows to share and lead free materials generated.

Gleducar community has resources as: an educational wiki which already contains more than 2,000 free educational resources (more than 5000 pages in total) and over 5,600 registered users; a virtual campus, a server webquest, multiple mailing lists with over 570 members and even a personal sites aggregator to centralize and register changes in some members's blogs of the Gleducar community

The technical infrastructure used by the NGO is provided by USLA (Free Software Users Argentina).
