= Pesce =

Pesce may refer to:

== Geography ==
- The Pesce Peninsula in West Antarctica

== Cinema ==
- Il pesce innamorato (‘The Fish in Love’), Italian comedy film released in 1999

== People ==
- Brett Pesce (born 1994), American hockey player
- Emidio Pesce (born 2002), Italian racing driver
- Frank Pesce (1946–2022), American actor
- Gaetano Pesce (1939–2024), Italian sculptor
- Giovanni Pesce (1918–2007), Italian anti-fascist partisan who fought in the Spanish Civil War and World War II
- Mark Pesce (born 1962), co-inventor of VRML
- Mattia Pesce (born 1989), Italian swimmer
- Miguel Ángel Pesce (born 1962), Argentine economist
- P. J. Pesce (born 1961), American film director and writer
- Simone Pesce (born 1982), Italian football player
- Stefano Pesce (born 1967), Italian actor
- Vincenzo Pesce (born 1959), Italian gangster of the Pesce 'ndrina

== Educational Institutes ==
- P.E.S. College of Engineering, an engineering college in Mandya, India
