= Free software movement =

Social movement

The free software movement is a social movement with the goal of obtaining and guaranteeing certain freedoms for software users, namely the freedoms to run, study, modify, and share copies of software. Software which meets these requirements, The Four Essential Freedoms of Free Software, is termed free software.

Although drawing on traditions and philosophies among members of the 1970s hacker culture and academia, Richard Stallman formally founded the movement in 1983 by launching the GNU Project. Stallman later established the Free Software Foundation in 1985 to support the movement.

== Philosophy ==
The philosophy of the Free Software Movement is based on promoting collaboration between programmers and computer users. This process necessitates the rejection of proprietary software and the promotion of free software. Stallman notes that this action would not hinder the progression of technology, as he states, "Wasteful duplication of system programming effort will be avoided. This effort can go instead into advancing the state of the art."

Members of the Free Software Movement believe that all software users should have the freedoms listed in The Free Software Definition. Members hold the belief that it is immoral to prohibit or prevent people from exercising these freedoms, and that they are required in creating a community where software users can help each other and have control over their technology. Regarding proprietary software, some believe that it is not strictly immoral, citing increased profitability in the business models available for proprietary software, along with technical features and convenience.

The Free Software Foundation espouses the principle that all software needs free documentation, as programmers should have the ability to update manuals to reflect modifications made to the software. Within the movement, the FLOSS Manuals foundation specializes in providing such documentation.

== Actions ==
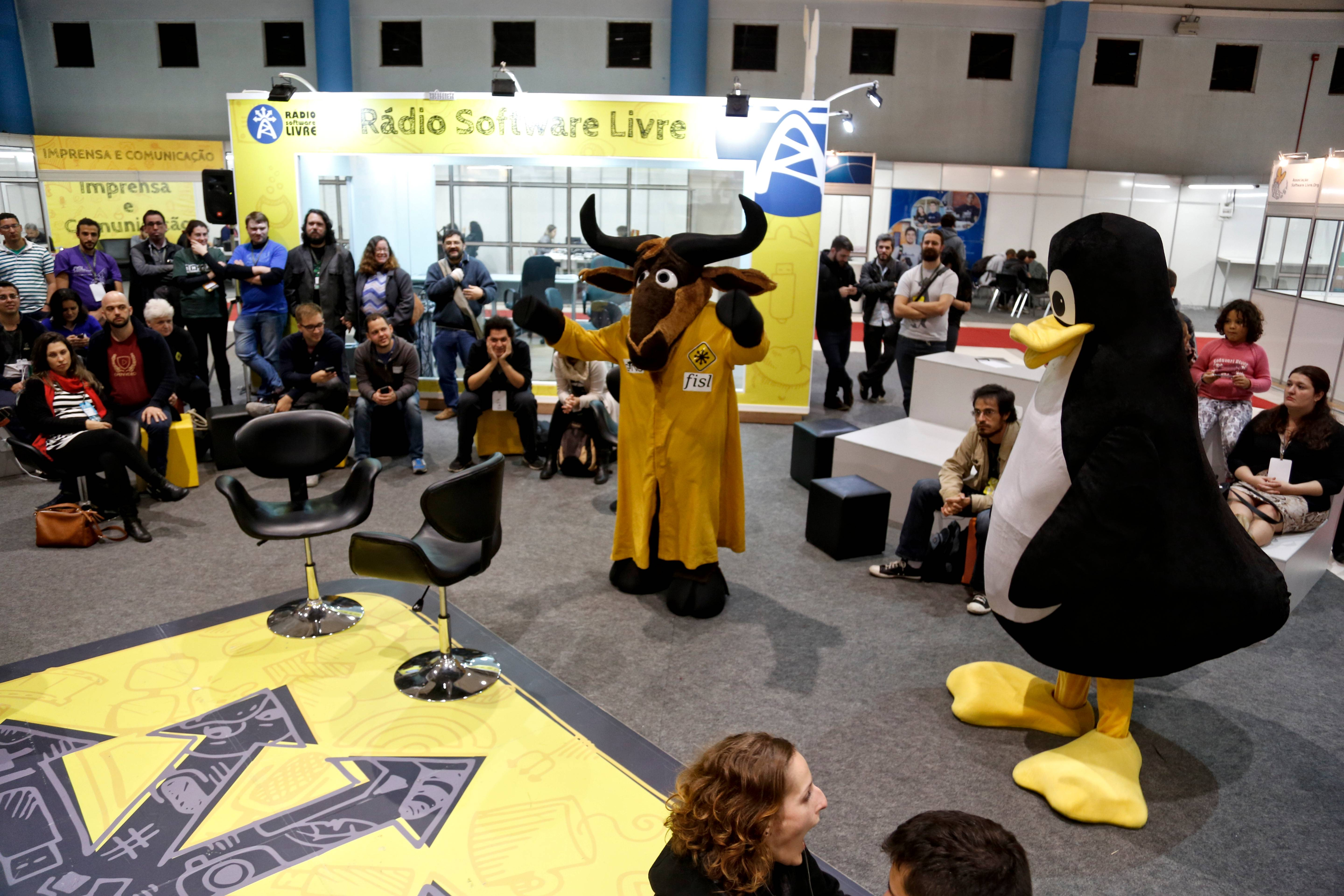
GNU and Tux mascots around free software supporters at FISL 16

=== Writing and spreading free software ===
The core work of the free software movement is focused on software development. The free software movement also rejects proprietary software, refusing to install software that does not give them the freedoms of free software. According to Stallman, "The only thing in the software field that is worse than an unauthorised copy of a proprietary program, is an authorised copy of the proprietary program because this does the same harm to its whole community of users, and in addition, usually the developer, the perpetrator of this evil, profits from it."

=== Building awareness ===
Some supporters of the free software movement take up public speaking, or host a stall at software-related conferences to raise awareness of software freedom. This is seen as important since people who receive free software, but who are not aware that it is free software, will later accept a non-free replacement or will add software that is not free software.

== Free software movement ==
The free software community is an informal term referring to users and developers of free software, as well as supporters of the free software movement. The movement sometimes refers to the open-source software community or a subset thereof. The Linux community is a subset of the free software community. The free software communities are characterized by the values, practices and principles that differ from other models of development and collaboration.

== Organisations ==
=== Asia ===
- Free Software Movement of India
- International Centre for Free and Open Source Software (ICFOSS)

=== Africa ===
- Free Software and Open Source Foundation for Africa

=== North America ===
- Free Software Foundation
- Software Freedom Law Center

=== South America ===
- Free Software Foundation Latin America
- Software Livre Brasil

=== Europe ===
- Free Software Foundation Europe
- Framasoft

=== Australia ===
- Free Software Australia

== Legislation and government ==
A lot of lobbying work has been done against software patents and expansions of copyright law. Other lobbying focuses directly on the use of free software by government agencies and government-funded projects.

=== Asia ===
==== China ====
In June 1997, the Society for Study, Application, and Development of Free Software was established under the China Software Industry Association in Beijing. Through this organization, the website freesoft.cei.gov.cn was developed, though the website is currently inaccessible on IP addresses located in the United States. The use of open-source software Linux in China has moved beyond government and educational institutions and has extended to other organizations such as financial institutions, telecommunications, and public security. Several Chinese researchers and scholars have claimed that the existence of FOSS in China has been important in challenging the presence of Microsoft, which Guangnan Ni, a member of the Chinese Academy of Engineering stated, "The monopoly of (Microsoft Windows) is even more powerful in China than other places in the world". Yi Zhou, a professor of mathematics at Fudan University, has also alleged that, "Government procurement of FLOSS for a number of years in China has compelled Microsoft to cut its prices of Office software substantially."

==== India ====
Government of India had issued Policy on Adoption of Open Source Software for Government of India in 2015 to drive uptake within the government. With the vision to transform India as a Software Product Nation, National Policy on Software Products-2019 was approved by the Government.

==== Pakistan ====
Free and Open Source Software (FOSS) is set up by Union of Information Technology. For the case of Pakistan, Pakistan Software Export Board (PSEB) aids in the creation and advocacy of FOSS usage in various government departments in addition to curbing illegality of copying that is software piracy. Promotion of adoption of FOSS is essential however it comes with problems of proprietary anti competition software practices including indulging in bribing and corruption by government departments. Pakistan works on the introduction of usage of open type basis of source Solutions in the curricula in schools and colleges. This is because of FOSS uniqueness in terms of political, democratic and social varieties of aspect regarding information communication and technology.

=== North America ===
==== United States ====
In the United States, there have been efforts to pass legislation at the state level encouraging the use of free software by state government agencies.

On January 11, 2022, two bills were shown on the New Hampshire legislating floor. The first bill called "HB 1273" was introduced by Democratic New Hampshire representative Eric Gallager, the bill prioritized "replacing proprietary software used by state agencies with free software." Gallager stated that to an extent, the proposed legislation will help distinguish "free software" and "open-source software", this will also put these two into state regulation. The second bill called "HB 1581" was proposed by Grafton Republican representative Lex Berezhny. The bill would've restored a requisite forcing "state agencies to use proprietary software" and as Lex put it, "when it is the most effective solution." He also said that requisite was happening between 2012 and 2018. According to the Concord Monitor, the state of New Hampshire had an already "thriving open source software community" with a view of "live free or die" but they had difficulty getting that notion with the state.

=== South America ===
==== Peru ====
Congressmen Edgar David Villanueva and Jacques Rodrich Ackerman have been instrumental in introducing free software in Peru, with bill 1609 on "Free Software in Public Administration". The incident invited the attention of Microsoft, Peru, whose general manager wrote a letter to Villanueva. His response received worldwide attention and is seen as a classic piece of argumentation favouring use of free software in governments.

==== Uruguay ====
Uruguay has a sanctioned law requiring that the state give priority to free software. It also requires that information be exchanged in open formats.

==== Venezuela ====
The Government of Venezuela implemented a free software law in January 2006. Decree No. 3,390 mandated all government agencies to migrate to free software over a two-year period.

=== Europe ===
Publiccode.eu is a campaign launched demanding a legislation requiring that publicly financed software developed for the public sector be made publicly available under a Free and Open Source Software licence. If it is public money, it should be public code as well.

==== France ====
The French Gendarmerie and the French National Assembly utilize the open source operating system Linux.

==== United Kingdom ====
Gov.uk keeps a list of "key components, tools and services that have gone into the construction of GOV.UK".

== Events ==
Free Software events happening all around the world connects people to increase visibility for Free software projects and foster collaborations.

== Economics ==
The free software movement has been extensively analyzed using economic methodologies, including perspectives from heterodox economics. Of particular interest to economists is the willingness of programmers in the free software movement to work, often producing higher-quality than proprietary programmers, without financial compensation. Studies comparing defect density in FLOSS projects and proprietary projects, shows that in all code size ranges open source code was of higher quality.

In his 1998 article "The High-Tech Gift Economy", Richard Barbrook suggested that the then-nascent free software movement represented a return to the gift economy building on hobbyism and the absence of economic scarcity on the Internet.

Gabriella Coleman has emphasized the importance of accreditation, respect, and honour within the free software community as a form of compensation for contributions to projects, over and against financial motivations.

The Swedish Marxian economist Johan Söderberg has argued that the free software movement represents a complete alternative to capitalism that may be expanded to create a post-work society. He argues that the combination of a manipulation of intellectual property law and private property to make goods available to the public and a thorough blend between labor and fun make the free software movement a communist economy.

== Subgroups and schisms ==
Since its inception, there is an ongoing contention between the many FLOSS organizations (FSF, OSI, Debian, Mozilla Foundation, Apache Foundation, etc.) within the free software movement, with the main conflicts centered around the organization's needs for compromise and pragmatism rather than adhering to founding values and philosophies.

=== Open source ===
The Open Source Initiative (OSI) was founded in February 1998 by Eric Raymond and Bruce Perens to promote the term "open-source software" as an alternative term for free software. The OSI aimed to address the perceived shortcomings and ambiguity of the term "free software", as well as shifting the focus of free software from a social and ethical issue to instead emphasize open source as a superior model for software development. The latter became the view of Eric Raymond and Linus Torvalds, while Bruce Perens argued that open source was meant to popularize free software under a new brand and called for a return to basic ethical principles.

Some free software advocates use the terms "Free and Open-Source Software" (FOSS) or "Free/Libre and Open-Source Software" (FLOSS) as a form of inclusive compromise, which brings free and open-source software advocates together to work on projects cohesively. Some users believe this is an ideal solution in order to promote both the user's freedom with the software and the pragmatic efficiency of an open-source development model. This view is reinforced by fact that majority of OSI-approved licenses and self-avowed open-source programs are also compatible with the free software formalisms and vice versa.

While free and open source software are often linked together, they offer two separate ideas and values. Richard Stallman has referred to open source as "a non-movement", as it "does not campaign for anything".

"Open source" addresses software being open as a practical question rather than an ethical dilemma – non-free software is not the best solution but nonetheless a solution. The free software movement views free software as a moral imperative: that proprietary software should be rejected, and that only free software should be developed and taught in order to make computing technology beneficial to the general public.

Although the movements have differing values and goals, collaborations between the Free Software Movement and Open Source Initiative have taken place when it comes to practical projects. By 2005, Richard Glass considered the differences to be a "serious fracture" but "vitally important to those on both sides of the fracture" and "of little importance to anyone else studying the movement from a software engineering perspective" since they have had "little effect on the field".

== Criticism and controversy ==
=== Principle compromises ===
Eric Raymond criticises the speed at which the free software movement is progressing, suggesting that temporary compromises should be made for long-term gains. Raymond argues that this could raise awareness of the software and thus increase the free software movement's influence on relevant standards and legislation.

Richard Stallman, on the other hand, sees the current level of compromise as a greater cause for worry.

=== Programmer income ===
Stallman said that this is where people get the misconception of "free": there is no wrong in programmers' requesting payment for a proposed project, or charging for copies of free software. Restricting and controlling the user's decisions on use is the actual violation of freedom. Stallman defends that in some cases, monetary incentive is not necessary for motivation since the pleasure in expressing creativity is a reward in itself. Conversely, Stallman admits that it is not easy to raise money for free software projects.

=== "Viral" copyleft licensing ===
The free software movement champions copyleft licensing schema (often pejoratively called "viral licenses"). In its strongest form, copyleft mandates that any works derived from copyleft-licensed software must also carry a copyleft license, so the license spreads from work to work like a computer virus might spread from machine to machine. Stallman has previously stated his opposition to describing the GNU GPL as "viral". These licensing terms can only be enforced through asserting copyrights.

Critics of copyleft licensing challenge the idea that restricting modifications is in line with the free software movement's emphasis on various "freedoms", especially when alternatives like MIT, BSD, and Apache licenses are more permissive. Proponents enjoy the assurance that copylefted work cannot usually be incorporated into non-free software projects. They emphasize that copyleft licenses may not attach for all uses and that in any case, developers can simply choose not to use copyleft-licensed software.

=== License proliferation and compatibility ===
FLOSS license proliferation is a serious concern in the FLOSS domain due to increased complexity of license compatibility considerations which limits and complicates source code reuse between FLOSS projects. The OSI and the FSF maintain their own lists of dozens of existing and acceptable FLOSS licenses. There is an agreement among most that the creation of new licenses should be minimized and those created should be made compatible with the major existing FLOSS licenses. Therefore, there was a strong controversy around the update of the GNU GPLv2 to the GNU GPLv3 in 2007, as the updated license is not compatible with the previous version. Several projects (mostly of the open source faction like the Linux kernel) decided to not adopt the GPLv3 while almost all of the GNU project's packages adopted it.

== See also ==
- GNU Manifesto
- History of free software
- Linux adoption
- Open-source movement
- Free-culture movement
- Free Software Foundation
- Open Source Initiative
- Software Freedom Conservancy
- Free Software Movement of India
- Free Software Foundation of India
- Free Software Foundation Europe
- Free Software Movement Karnataka
- Free Software Foundation Tamil Nadu
- Swecha
- Gift economy
