= Ciber =

Information technology company

Ciber Global
- Type: Private
- Industry: Technology consulting, outsourcing services
- Founded: 1974
- Headquarters: Troy, Michigan
- Key people: Madhava Reddy (president and CEO), Chary Mudumby (Chief Technology Officer)
- Products: Technology and business consulting, application management, talent services
- Website: www.ciber.com

Ciber Global, now a part of HTC Global Services, is a global information technology consulting, services and outsourcing company with commercial clients.

The company was founded in Detroit, Michigan, in 1974. The company was called the "Consultants in Business Engineering Research" (Ciber). In May 2017, HTC Global Services acquired Ciber.

== History ==
=== Founding ===
Ciber was founded in 1974 by three individuals, one of whom would remain with the company and guide its fortunes for its crucial first two decades. Of the three original founders of Ciber, Bobby G. Stevenson emerged as the key figure in Ciber's history, shaping a start-up computer consulting firm into a leading national force by the 1990s, when the computer consulting industry was generating more than $30 billion worth of business a year. A graduate of Texas Tech University, Stevenson spent the years between his formal education and the formation of Ciber working as a programmer analyst for International Business Machines Corporation (IBM) and LTV Steel in Houston. By the early 1970s, when Stevenson was in his early 30s, he and two other colleagues decided to make a go of it on their own and organized Ciber, an acronym for "consultants in business, engineering, and research."

Stevenson and Ciber's other co-founders established the company Ciber to provide specialized, technical assistance, offering contract computer software and hardware consulting services. Its early clients included organizations that lacked internal resources or technical expertise to use computers in their day-to-day operations. As the business use of computers increased, the demand for outside service firms who could implement and support new systems.

Although Ciber entered the business of computer consulting services at a relatively early time, the company's physical and financial growth did not mirror the growth of its industry. Ciber grew at a modest pace initially, then embraced a new business strategy during the mid-1980s that ignited prolific growth. Stevenson watched over Ciber during both of the company's two eras, heading the company during its contrastingly slower period of growth and leading the charge during its decided rise during the 1990s.

During Ciber's inaugural year of business, Stevenson served as the company's vice-president in charge of recruiting and managing the fledgling firm's technical staff, a post he would occupy until November 1977, when he was named Ciber's chief executive officer after the tragic accidental death of the CEO and Co-founder, Richard L. Ezinga. From late 1977 into the 1990s, Stevenson was responsible for all of Ciber's operations. At first, Stevenson and the two other co-founders targeted their consulting services exclusively to the automotive industry, establishing Ciber's first office in the hotbed of automotive production in the United States, Detroit, Michigan. Ciber did not remain wedded to the automotive industry for long, however. A few short years after its formation, Ciber began tailoring its services to the oil and gas industry as well, a move that occurred at roughly the same time as the company's geographic expansion. Two years after the company opened its doors in Detroit, an office in Phoenix was opened. A year later, in 1977, an office was established in Houston. A Denver office was opened in 1979, followed by the opening of a Dallas office in 1980 and an Atlanta office in 1987. The following year, Ciber relocated its corporate headquarters to Englewood, Colorado. While executive officers circulated throughout Ciber's Englewood facility, the company embarked on the most prolific growth period in its history to that point.

=== 1980s ===
A year after the move to Englewood and 15 years after its founding, Ciber competed in the burgeoning industry of computer consulting services as a minor player. Total sales in 1989 amounted to a mere $13 million, small change when compared with the revenue volume generated by the country's leading computer consulting firms. By this point, however, Ciber executives were plotting an era of dramatic growth for their company. During the mid-1980s, Stevenson and other Ciber executives adopted a new growth strategy that focused on the development of a new range of services and the realization of both physical and financial growth through the acquisition of established computer consulting firms. Although the strategy embraced during the mid-1980s would take half a decade to manifest itself in any meaningful way, once the strategy for the future began to take shape in a tangible form, Ciber began its resolute rise to the upper echelon of its industry.

By the end of 1989, when annual sales had slipped past the $10 million mark, the plans formulated midway through the decade moved from the drawing board to implementation. Ciber's expansion in 1990 included the opening of offices in Cleveland, Orlando, and Tampa, moves that were associated with the development of new clientele in the telecommunications industry. As Ciber focused its marketing efforts toward telecommunications providers during the early 1990s, securing contracts with industry giants such as AT&T, GTE, and U.S. West Communications, Inc., the company found itself occupying fertile ground in the computer consulting market. Not only were computers and their technology becoming increasingly sophisticated, progressing at a pace that demanded the help of experts such as Ciber's consultants, but the shifting dynamics of the corporate world also favored companies like Ciber.

The early years of the 1990s were marked by a national economic recession that forced many of the country's corporations to alter their business strategies. As business declined and profit margins shrank, downsizing became the mantra of business leaders from coast to coast. Payroll was trimmed, entire departments were cut from corporate budgets, and, as a consequence, many companies found themselves lacking the resources and skills to perform certain tasks in-house, creating a greater need for the specialized services offered by Ciber. To meet this demand, Ciber contracted out specialists to help the nation's largest corporations complete computer projects and cope with hardware and software problems as they arose. Ciber consultants wrote and maintained software that performed a host of chores, including inventory control, accounts payable, and customer support.

Although the conditions were ripe for rapid growth as the 1990s began, Ciber's stature at the start of the decade prohibited it to a certain degree from capturing a sizable share of the computer consulting market. The company was too small to realize the growth potential that surrounded it. Mac J. Slingerlend, who joined the company in 1989 as executive vice-president and chief financial officer before being named president and chief operating officer in 1996, reflected on Ciber's diminutive size years after the company had grown into a genuine national contender, noting, "We wanted to be a survivor. We were the smallest national player, and we needed to get larger quickly."

=== 1990s ===
Getting larger quickly ranked as Ciber's chief objective during the first half of the 1990s, engendering a period of growth that lifted the company's revenue volume from the $13 million recorded when Slingerlend joined the company to more than $150 million by the time he was promoted to the twin posts of president and chief operating officer. Growth was achieved largely by purchasing established computer consulting firms, as Ciber embarked on an acquisition program that ranked it as the most active computer consulting acquirer in the nation during the first half of the 1990s. More than a dozen acquisitions were completed in six years' time, adding more than $70 million to the company's revenue base and greatly increasing the Colorado-based firm's national presence. Equally as important as the growth achieved through acquisition was the added expertise Ciber gained by swallowing up established computer consulting firms. During the 1990s, the push was on to grow larger quickly and to gain personnel that would enable Ciber to tackle more complex projects. Instead of just writing programs tailored to the specifications of its clients, Ciber executives were endeavoring to create a consulting firm that could identify problems and provide solutions, a transformation that would propel the company into the market for higher-margin services.

The majority of the acquisitions that helped Ciber expand its services and broaden its national presence were completed after the company's initial public offering of stock in March 1994. Once the company converted to public ownership (Stevenson retained control of more than 50 percent of the company's shares), acquisitions followed in steady succession. In June 1994, Ciber acquired all of the business operations of $16-million-in-sales C.P.U., Inc. for approximately $10 million. Based in Rochester, New York, C.P.U. operated as a computer consulting firm employing 190 consultants in six branch offices and served clients such as Northern Telecom and Xerox Corporation. The C.P.U. acquisition was Ciber's fifth of the decade and by far the largest. In the coming two years, as expansion picked up pace, annual sales more than doubled, and the company's net income, inflated by the move into more complex, higher-margin services, nearly quadrupled.

Following the C.P.U. acquisition, Ciber purchased Holmdel, New Jersey-based Interface Systems, Inc., a systems-consulting firm with 48 consultants and $5 million in annual revenue. Interface Systems was acquired in January 1995 and was followed by the May 1995 acquisition of Spencer & Spencer Systems, Inc., a 141-consultant, $13-million-in-sales computer programming provider with offices in St. Louis and Indianapolis. Next, in June 1995, Ciber reached across to the West Coast and acquired Concord, California-based Business Information Technology, Inc., a five-branch, 125-consultant computer consulting firm with $20 million in annual sales. A fourth acquisition was completed before the end of 1995 when Ciber purchased Broadway & Seymour, Inc., its Rochester, Minnesota office, and its 45 consultants. By the end of 1995, sales had increased from the $79.8 million generated in 1994 to more than $120 million, and company executives were set to launch Ciber's CIBR2000 division, a venture representative of the company's desire to provide more complex, higher-margin services.

Introduced in December 1995, CIBR2000 service was designed as a solution to a potentially devastating problem with wide-ranging ramifications. Many software programs written between the 1960s and 1990s used a two-digit date format to record calendar dates, thereby rendering a host of computer calculations inaccurate after 11:59:59 p.m., December 31, 1999. Without the ability to recognize "00" as the beginning of the new century, computer programs that performed calculations related to inventory control, invoices, interest payments, pension payments, contract expirations, license and lease renewals, and myriad other tasks would generate false reports, create computer "bugs," and perhaps cause systemwide shutdowns, all under the presumption that "00" signified the year 1900. Ciber's CIBR2000 division was created to solve the dilemma posed by the century date change and represented an area of substantial growth potential for the company during the latter half of the 1990s.

At the time CIBR2000 service was being introduced, Ciber employed roughly 1,800 consultants and operated 28 branch offices scattered throughout the country. More than half of the company's sales was derived from 20 clients, including industry stalwarts such as American Express Company, AT&T, Ford Motor Company, IBM, MCI Telecommunications, Mellon Bank, Monsanto Corp., U.S. West Communications, Inc., and Xerox Corporation.

On the acquisition front, 1996 proved to be a busy year, eclipsing the achievements of 1995. In March, the company acquired Columbus, Ohio-based OASYS, Inc., a provider of contract computer programming services that gave Ciber a new geographic location in Columbus supported by 20 information technology consultants. In May 1996, Ciber acquired Practical Business Solutions, Inc., an information technology company with offices in Boston and Providence, Rhode Island. Two months later, the company completed yet another acquisition, purchasing the Business Systems Development division of DataFocus, Inc., a computer consulting firm with offices in Fairfax, Virginia and Edison, New Jersey. Not stopping there, Ciber brought another company under its corporate umbrella in September, when it acquired Spectrum Technology Group, Inc., a management consulting firm based in Somerville, New Jersey that strengthened Ciber's management consulting and project management services.

=== 2000s ===
Ciber had been approved as an independent testing authority in 1997, and by 2007, they were the largest tester of voting machine software in the United States. They had offices in Huntsville, Alabama, Greenwood Village, Colorado, and McLean, Virginia. Clients whose equipment Ciber had tested include Diebold Election Systems.

In 2000, Ciber donated $25,000 to the Republican National Committee. That year, they were the only certified voting system test laboratory in the United States. Between 2000 and 2004, Ciber donated $48,000 to Republicans, and did not donate to Democrats. In response, Kevin Shelley, then-California Secretary of State said, "I think it compromises the integrity of the process if you have the testing entities give contributions to one party or another. It's not appropriate."

In October 2006, former Maryland state legislator Cheryl Kagan anonymously received a package containing computer disks with source code apparently created by Diebold Election Systems that was used by Maryland during the 2004 elections. The disks had logos from Ciber and Wyle, with both companies denying ownership.

Ciber was accredited under federal government guidelines from 2002, but as of 2007, they had not been certified for updated guidelines set in 2005. The lab had lost its accreditation during the summer of 2006, with the Election Assistance Commission (EAC) finding that Ciber did not have a standard quality assurance procedure, that the lab had insufficient time for testing, and that the lab risked depending on the voting machine vendors for testing. However, the EAC did not share its report with the public or election officials until The New York Times shared it in January 2007, after the 2006 United States elections. Avi Rubin warned that voting machine systems that Ciber had certified were previously used in elections, and Ciber losing its accreditation "calls into question those systems that they tested". The New York State Board of Elections had also suspended Ciber's license later that month. In June 2007, the EAC voted against interim accreditation for Ciber, citing that the company did not tell the commission in time that two key employees had left to join a competitor, Wyle.

== Sources ==
- Washington Technology - CIBER was selected as one of the leaders in the Government solutions sector
- CDC Uses CIBER-Built Solution to Alert Public Health Officials and Public Health Departments
