= Swecha =

Free software movement non-profit organization

- స్వేచ్ఛ
- Formation: 2005
- Type: Non-profit organization
- Headquarters: Hyderabad
- Region served: Andhra Pradesh & Telangana
- Official language: Telugu
- Main organ: Executive Committee
- Affiliations: Free Software Movement of India
- Website: swecha.org
- Formerly called: Free Software Foundation, Andhra Pradhesh

Swecha is a non-profit organization formerly called Free Software Foundation Andhra Pradesh (FSF-AP). It is a Telugu operating system released in the year 2005, and is a part of Free Software Movement of India (FSMI). The organization is a social movement directed towards educating the masses about the essence of Free Software and empower the community.

Swecha organizes workshops and seminars in the Indian states of Telangana and Andhra Pradesh. Presently Swecha is active in many engineering colleges like International Institute of Information Technology, Hyderabad, Jawaharlal Nehru Technological University, Hyderabad, Chaitanya Bharathi Institute of Technology, St. Martin's Engineering College, Sridevi Women's Engineering College, Mahatma Gandhi Institute of Technology, SCIENT Institute of Technology, CMR Institute of Technology, Hyderabad, Jyothishmathi College of Engineering and Technology, MVGR College of Engineering, K L University and Ace Engineering College.

== Objectives ==
The main objectives of the organization are as follows:

- To take forward free software and its ideological implications to all corners of India.
- To create awareness among computer users in the use of free software.
- To work towards usage of free software in all streams of sciences and research.
- To take forward implementation and usage of free software in school education, academics and higher education.
- To work towards e-literacy and bridging digital divide based on free software and mobilizing the underprivileged.
- To work among developers on solutions catering to societal & national requirements.
- To work towards a policy change favoring free software in all walks of life.

== Activities ==
- Swecha hosted a National Convention for Academics and Research which was attended by researchers and academicians from different parts of the country. Former President of India Dr A.P.J. Abdul Kalam, while inaugurating the conference and declaring it open, asked everyone to Embrace Free Software and the Philosophy associated with it.
- Swecha organised an event to spread the word about Free and open-source software(FOSS) and celebrate the launch of Mozilla Foundation's Mozilla Firefox 3.5., the latest stable version at that time. D.Bhuvan Krishna, co-convener of the Swecha Project, commented that transparency in software code was the need of the hour, and encouraged attendees to embrace open source software.
- Swecha launched a 15-day workshop at Chaitanya Bharathi Institute of Technology(CBIT) for software engineering aspirants from across the country. It was designed to provide students with an opportunity to understand the importance of contributing towards open source software.
- Swecha setup a one-day workshop on free software in the Department of Computer Science and Systems Engineering, Andhra University College of Engineering.The students who attended the workshop along with the faculty members teamed up to formally launch the GNU/Linux User Group(GLUG).
- Swecha hosted a Freedom Fest to promote use of free software. About 1,500 students from 80 colleges from Andhra Pradesh, Tamil Nadu, Chhattisgarh convened on the campus to voice their concerns against proprietary software and share their passion for free software.
- Swecha hosted A 2 Days International Technical Symposium on Free Internet (DFI) & Free Software in Hyderabad, Gachibowli on the 24th of January, 2014. More than 4700 participants attended including the 20+ delegates from ThoughtWorks & Social Activist across the world.
- Swecha organises summer camps every year in which large number of students participate. The camps focus on training students on Free Software Technology and the culture of sharing and collaborative development of free software. In the 2014 itself 15 days camps were conducted for 2000+ students. It is here participants collaboratively engage in the conduct of the Summer Camps.

== Projects ==
Swecha is a free software project aimed at coming out with a localised version of Linux operating system in Telugu and providing global software solutions to the local people with the Free Software development model by working together with the community of developers and users all over. The prime objective of Swecha OS is to provide a complete computing solution to a population that speaks and understands only Telugu. The target users of the Distro being the entire community that is a prey of the digital divide. This project helps in coming out with a solution for the digital divide and allows the possibility of digital unite becoming a reality. The project aims at bridging the gap between the computer technology that exists predominantly in English and the Telugu-speaking community of India. The project also aims at providing a framework for development and maintenance of Free Software projects taken up by the community.

Bala Swecha is a free software project, initiated by the Swecha for tiny tots, It is a school distro with many of the useful interactive applications for the school goers. Its stack is filled with educational suites for all the standards right from elementary to tenth standards. They cover a wide range of applications which make the student learn Maths, Physics, Geography, Chemistry etc., very easily. Swecha has taken up many activities in training the school teachers, computer instructors of several government schools. The aim of the Distro is to deliver a Free Software-based operating system for the project of "Sarva Shiksha Abhiyan" initiated by the government. There isn't such operating system till now which gives full freedom with an educational stack. Swecha has the plans of localizing BalaSwecha for the benefit of Telugu medium students.

E-Swecha is a free software project initiated by the Swecha and is aimed at developing a free operating system, which is not built by a software firm.. neither is it built by a few programmers.. it is a collaborative work of hundreds of Swecha Volunteers/engineering students in and around Hyderabad to, for and by the engineering students.

== Activism ==
- Swecha organised a free software workshop and delivered a talk on "The Age of Inequality", Mr. Palagummi Sainath told the gathered engineering students and researchers that half of the country's children suffered from malnourishment and at the same time, the situation was getting worse for farmers and suicides among them were high, Despite a high growth rate, malnourishment of children in the country remained at 46 per cent which was behind countries of Sub-Saharan Africa where these figures stood between 32 per cent to 35 percent
- Swecha widespread protests taking place across the country after the arrest of two girls over a Facebook comment, have now reached Hyderabad. On Sunday, a group, consisting mostly of IT professionals, students and academicians, protested at Indira Park against the controversial Section 66 (A) of Information Technology Act
- The Swecha was in the forefront of the protests against the inclusion of proprietary software in the representation to All India Council for Technical Education (AICTE) against the deal with Microsoft.
- Swecha organised a seminar on "Employment opportunities in changing technology landscape", on 23 September at Mahima Gardens, Member of German Hacker Association Chaos Computer Club, Andy Müller-Maguhn, director of Social and Economic Justice at Thoughtworks, Matt Simons and secretary of Free Software Movement of India Y.Kiran Chandra addressed the students and later joined the Free Software Movement started by Richard Stallman.
- The seminar was organised by Swecha, on the free software development model, Mr Neville Roy Singham explained that spying or surveillance can be easily done through hardware as well as software, and that no electronic device can be safe from it. The NSA is doing it because it is simply very cheap for them, and that they are taking in literally every piece of information they can get. More than 3,000 students, mainly from the engineering stream attended the seminar, which continued till late evening, as many other speakers like Renata Avila, a human rights lawyer and internet freedom activist from Guatemala, Dmytri Kleiner, Telemiscommunications specialist, and Zack Exley, ex-Chief Revenue Officer, Wikimedia foundation also conducted seminars and interacted with students.
- Internet surveillance and digital snooping on the people is the biggest threat to democracy said by the Richard Stallman Internet surveillance and spying is dangerous and threatens the functioning of democracy, Dr. Stallman told students at a seminar on "Free Software and Internet Freedom", organised by Swecha on the Acharya Nagarjuna University campus.
- Swecha has demanded that the Central and State governments bring in policy changes on information technology to give fillip to hardware manufacturing, setting up of data centres and software design centres. Mr. Y. Kiranchandra Chairman of Swecha quoted data from the mobile telephony market to augment his demand. "The annual market for mobile telephones in the country is about Rs. 16,000 crore, yet India is yet to have its own mobile manufacturing unit. The mobile handsets designed in China, South Korea and Finland are simply being relabelled and sold in the country".

== See also ==
- Free Software Foundation
- Free Software Movement
- Free Software Foundation Tamil Nadu
- Free Software Movement of Karnataka
- Software Freedom Law Center
- Guifi.net
