= Edgar David Villanueva =

Peruvian politician

Dr Edgar David Villanueva Núñez is a politician and congressman in the Republic of Peru. He is best known for introducing a bill to mandate use of free software in public agencies. The introduction of the Bill 1609 invited the attention of Microsoft, to whose letter Dr Villanueva wrote a famous reply.

A bill that mandates consideration of open source software was passed into law in October 2005.

Both the Bill and Dr Villanueva's letter have been widely cited by pro-active governments and Free Software activists as a convincing rationale behind the introduction of Free Software in Governments.

== See also ==
- Free software movement
