= SIPfoundry =

SIPfoundry is a non-profit organization that develops open-source telephone software projects based on the Session Initiation Protocol (SIP).

Founded in 2004, SIPfoundry established ties with the SIP Forum. SIPfoundry promotes the standardization of SIP and interoperability of SIP products through the SIP Forum Test Framework (SFTF).

SIPfoundry spawned the development of sipXecs, an open source and standards-compliant SIP private branch exchange (PBX) for Linux.

== See also ==
- sipXecs
- VoIP
