= HTC Global Services =

American company

- Type: Private
- Industry: Information technology; business process outsourcing services
- Founded: United States (1990)
- Headquarters: 3270 West Big Beaver Road, Troy, Michigan, U.S.
- Key people: Madhava Reddy (president and CEO)
- Number of employees: 11,000

HTC Global Services Inc., established in 1990 and headquartered in Troy, Michigan, United States, is a provider of information technology and business process services.

== History ==
HTC Global Services Inc. was founded in 1990 by Indian entrepreneur Madhava Reddy, as a Michigan-based, privately owned information technology and business process outsourcing services company. Reddy is the president and CEO of the company. Currently the company has 11,000 employees globally including from Ciber and CareTech, which it has acquired in 2017 and 2014 respectively.

In 2018, the company invested ₹100 crore in a 4,500-seat development center located in Vandalur, to the south of Chennai, which will support the company's IT operations and business process outsourcing growth. In India it has centers in Chennai, Hyderabad, and Bengaluru in India, with other places of operations in Michigan (US), Singapore, Australia, the Middle East and Malaysia.

== Acquisitions ==
In 2014, the company acquired CareTech Solutions, a US-based healthcare IT services provider. CareTech now operates as a wholly owned subsidiary of HTC and provides IT services primarily to the healthcare providers in the US.

In May 2017, HTC Global Services acquired Ciber, a global information technology consulting, services and outsourcing company for $93 million US, headquartered in Greenwood Village, Colorado.

In 2021, HTC Global Services unified its subsidiaries CareTech and Ciber under one company name, HTC Global Services.

== Services ==
The company deals in application services, application maintenance and support services, mobile applications, artificial intelligence, digital transformation, data management and analytics, ERP, EGrAMS, and HTC CMS. HTC also deals in content digitization, eBook conversion, and back office services.

In 2022, HTC partnered with Guidewire as a Consulting Select partner for the Americas to help insurers adapt to a rapidly changing industry.

In 2021, HTC partnered with Informatica as its value-added distributor for the India market to accelerate digital transformation through cloud adoption.

In September 2018, the company inked a pact with Automation Anywhere, a developer of robotic process automation software based in California, to further boost HTC's RPA (robotic process automation) services, by building BOT-based industry-specific solutions with cognitive abilities.

It developed software service offers and product developments for sectors in the field of analytics, mobility, infrastructure services and emerging technologies. Its global clients include JP Morgan, Canon, Reserve Bank of India, Bank of America, MRF and Electronics Corporation of Tamil Nadu.

== Products ==
The company offers grant management software that automates the grant management process. HTC has installed Enterprise Grants Management System (EGrAMS) for various states and state agencies in the US.

HTC is a Tier 2 investment partner of Kuali Foundation to develop and deliver a next-generation library management system for various universities.

== See also ==
- List of IT consulting firms
- List of public listed software companies of India
- Information technology in India
- List of Indian IT companies
