= MultiService Forum =

- Company type: Industry association
- Industry: Telecommunications
- Founded: 1998
- Website: msforum.org at the Wayback Machine (archived 2013-03-19)

The MultiService Forum (MSF), originally Multiservice Switching Forum, was a telecommunications industry association which promoted interoperability in the field of next generation networking products and services from 1998 to 2013. The open-member organization included equipment vendors such as AT&T, Alcatel-Lucent, and Cisco Systems, fixed and mobile network operators such as Verizon, NTT, BT and Vodafone, and others. MSF produced Implementation Agreements, which specify the implementation of communication technologies, or their configuration for achieving interoperation.

== Working groups ==
The Services Working Group (SWG) was formed to support communication service providers. The Interoperability Working Group was formed to provide demonstrations of equipment and services working together.
