= SipXecs =

SIPfoundry sipXecs

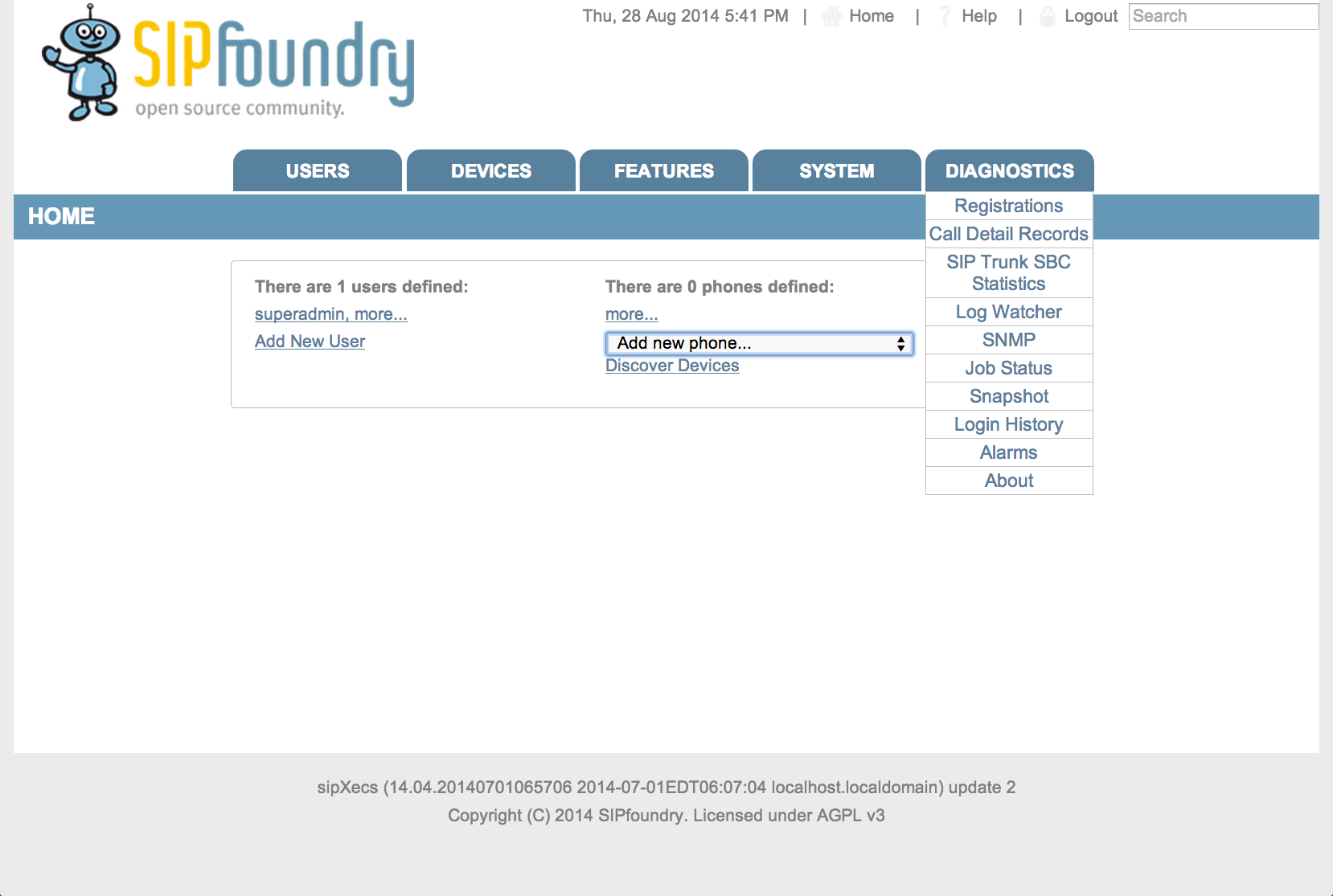
- Screenshot of the sipXecs Admin UI
- Developer(s): SIPfoundry
- Stable release: 14.04.2 / July 7, 2014
- Operating system: CentOS RHEL
- Platform: x86-64
- Available in: English, prompts in 15 languages
- Type: IP telephony, Software as a service, CAAS
- License: AGPL-3.0-or-later
- Website: www.sipfoundry.org

SipXecs is a free software enterprise communications system. It was initially developed by Pingtel Corporation in 2003 as a voice over IP telephony server located in Boston, MA. The server was later extended with additional collaboration capabilities as part of the SIPfoundry project. Since its extension, sipXecs now acts as a software implementation of the Session Initiation Protocol (SIP), making it a full IP-based communications system.

SipXecs competitors include other open-source telephony and SoftSwitch solutions such as Asterisk, FreeSWITCH, and the SIP Express Router.

== History ==
Development of sipXecs began in 2003 by Pingtel Corporation. In 2004, Pingtel adopted an open-source business model and contributed the codebase to the not-for-profit organization SIPfoundry. It has been an open source project since then.

Pingtel's assets were acquired by Bluesocket in July 2007. In August 2008 the Pingtel assets were acquired from Bluesocket by Nortel. Subsequent to the acquisition by Nortel, Nortel released the SCS500 product based on sipXecs. SCS500 was positioned as an open and software-only telephony server for the SMB market up to 500 users and received some recognition. It was later renamed SCS and positioned as an enterprise communications system.

Subsequent to the Nortel bankruptcy and the acquisition of the Nortel assets by Avaya, sipXecs continued to be used as the basis for the Avaya Live cloud based communications service.

In April 2010 the founders of SIPfoundry founded eZuce, a commercial version of the software.

== Information ==
SipXecs is designed as a software-only, distributed cloud application. It runs on the Linux operating system CentOS or RHEL on either virtualized or physical servers. A minimum configuration allows running all of the sipXecs components on a single server, including database, all available services, and the sipXecs management. Global clusters can be built using built-in auto-configuration capabilities from the centralized management system.

SipXecs uses MongoDB as a distributed and partition tolerant database for global transactions, includes CFEngine for orchestration of clusters and JasperReports for reporting. The management and configuration system is based on the Spring Framework. sipXecs includes FreeSWITCH as its media server and Openfire for presence and instant messaging services.

SipXecs follows standards such as Session Initiation Protocol (SIP), SRTP, Extensible Messaging and Presence Protocol (XMPP), SIP and XMPP over TLS, and several Web standards including WebRTC, WebSOCKET and Representational State Transfer (REST).

== Adoption ==
Amazon.com was an early adopter of sipXecs. This initial 5,000 user deployment expanded considerably in the following years.

OnRelay, a company in the UK, selected sipXecs for its fixed-mobile convergence solution sold to carriers.

Colorado State University and Cedarville University of Ohio committed to sipXecs in 2010.

Red Hat deployed a commercial version of sipXecs from eZuce globally in 2012.

Under the SIPfoundry Higher Education Program (HEP) and as of 2014 Lafayette College, St. Mary's University, Messiah College, Colorado School of Mines, Carthage College deployed sipXecs to replace their respective PBX systems.

SipXecs is used by small and large enterprises ranging up to about 20,000 users per cluster. SIPfoundry lists the following users on its Web site: Brevard County FL, Dutch Police, Easter Seals, Siemens Transportation, British Airways.

== Availability ==
SipXecs is available for Red Hat Linux and CentOS. It runs virtualized in different cloud environments such as the Amazon Elastic Compute Cloud, the Google Compute Engine, the HP Cloud, IBM SoftLayer, VMware vCloud and VMware ESX, OpenStack environments, and clouds from other vendors using these technologies.

== Licensing and Copyright ==
SIPfoundry distributes the sipXecs source code under the AGPL-3.0-or-later license.

Many different corporate and individual contributors contributed to sipXecs, including Pingtel, Bluesocket, Nortel, Avaya, and eZuce as some of the larger corporate contributors representing 864,791 lines of code. In addition, the sipXecs solution includes many other open-source components. SIPfoundry holds Copyright on all derivative work. Contributions to sipXecs are made under a Contributor Agreement, which grants SIPfoundry shared Copyright with the original author on all contributed code.

== Hardware ==
SipXecs supports a wide range of SIP compatible hardware, such as PSTN gateways, desk phones, softphones and mobile phone applications. A plug n'play auto-configuration capability is available for phones from currently (software release 14.04) 18 different vendors.

== SIP reference implementation ==
The SipXecs system represents a reference implementation of the SIP standard. It was used at SIPIT interoperability events organized by the SIP Forum to test interoperability of SIP solutions from many different vendors.

== See also ==
- Comparison of VoIP software
- List of free and open-source software packages
- List of SIP software
