= Open Source for America =

Open Source for America (OSFA) is a consortium of various organizations established to advocate for and support the use of free and open-source software in the U.S. Federal government. It consists of various open source foundations, and companies, including GNOME, Mozilla, and Canonical. The organization consists of various committees and working groups, one of which is Mil-OSS.
