= Free Software Foundation Tamil Nadu =

Not-for-profit foundation promoting free software in India

- இலவச மென்பொருள் அறக்கட்டளை தமிழ்நாடு
- Abbreviation: FSFTN
- Formation: 2008
- Type: Not-for-profit organisation
- Purpose: To spread free software philosophy among the masses and help in bridging the digital divide using free software and also by mobilising the under privileged.
- Headquarters: Okkiyampet, Chennai
- Location: Chennai
- Region served: Tamil Nadu, India
- Official language: Tamil, English
- Main organ: Executive Committee
- Affiliations: Free Software Movement of India
- Website: www.fsftn.org

Free Software Foundation Tamil Nadu (or FSFTN in short) (Tamil: கட்டற்ற மென்பொருள் அறக்கட்டளை தமிழ்நாடு) is a not-for-profit organisation formed in 2008 as a part of Free Software Movement of India (FSMI). This organisation is a social movement that works towards enlightening the masses with the essence of free software and to liberate knowledge. FSFTN organises different workshops and seminars in Tamil Nadu among the youth to spread the idea of knowledge liberation.

Presently FSFTN is active in campuses like Indian Institute of Technology Madras, Anna University, and Madras Institute of Technology in and around Chennai.

== Name ==
Free Software Foundation Tamil Nadu is the body working as a part of Free Software Movement of India and not the Free Software Foundation of India. It is often believed that FSFTN is the official chapter of Free Software Foundation or Free Software Foundation of India. Recent disclaimer of Free Software Foundation Tamil Nadu makes clear that FSFTN is a part of Free Software Movement of India and they are not associated with either Free Software Foundation or Free Software Foundation of India anyway other than the ideology.

== Objectives ==
As per the FSFTN site the main objectives of the organisation are as follows:

- To take forward free software and its ideological implications to all corners of our country from the developed domains to the underprivileged.
- To create awareness among computer users in the use of free software.
- To work towards usage of free software in all stream of sciences and research.
- To take forward implementation and usage of free software in school education, academics and higher education.
- To work towards e-literacy and bridging digital divide based on free software and mobilising the underprivileged.
- To work among developers on solutions catering to societal & national requirements.
- To work towards a policy change favoring free software in all walks of life.

== GNU/Linux Users Group (GLUG) ==
The GNU/Linux Users Group (GLUG) are the essential place for Knowledge sharing activities for Colleges and Regions co-ordinated by FSFTN. FSFTN has both Regional and College GLUGs. The GLUGs operate at various levels and is guided by the Core Committee Members of FSFTN. The functionalities and structure of GLUG are as follows,

- Each GLUG will have a Representative who will co-ordinate the GLUG and take care of the activities of the GLUG
- The College GLUG consists of only the College Students and a Staff Representative
- The College GLUG organises activities and events inside the college and will aim to bring people involving them in Community Contributions, Projects, etc.
- The Regional GLUG consists of members from the locality and gets involved in Knowledge Sharing sessions and bring in new people from various colleges in and around the region
- GLUGs are the main point of contact for FOSS related activities and events in the locality
- Each College and Regional will plan for Software Freedom Day (SFD), Education Freedom Day (EFD) and many such activities in a year.
- GLUG members will represent their GLUG in the Summer Camp organised by FSFTN every year.

== Activism ==
The Free Software Foundation Tamil Nadu was in the forefront of the protests against the inclusion of proprietary software in the free laptop scheme by the Government of Tamil Nadu.

On 6 February 2012, FSFTN organised a lecture on "Freedom, Free Software and Education" by the founder of Free Software Foundation - Richard Matthew Stallman at IIT Madras in Chennai.

On 19 February 2012, a Mozilla localisation seminar was organised by the Free Software Foundation, Tamil Nadu at IIT Madras.

On 9 June 2012, FSFTN conducted a protest against Intermediaries Guidelines Rules and spread awareness about the importance of a free Internet through posters, distribution of pamphlets and speeches by some of the volunteers at Besant Nagar Beach, Chennai.

In June 2013, FSFTN conducted 5 days workshop in collaboration with ILUGC at IIT-Madras on various technologies and discussed about social issues like "Internet Democracy","Gender Biasing" etc.

On 23 April 2015, as part of Free Software Movement of India's call for campaign in support of NetNeutrality, FSFTN organised a walkathon in Besant Nagar Beach

== See also ==
- Free Software Movement of India
- Free Software Movement of Karnataka
- Swecha
