= Airtel Zero =

Airtel Zero was a platform launched on 6 April 2015 in India by Bharti Airtel, a multinational telecommunications service company across South Asia and, at the time, the largest cellular service provider in India, with 192.22 million subscribers. As per reports, Airtel Zero was a platform through which Airtel would have offered users free access to certain mobile applications and services from companies who had signed up with Airtel.

== History ==
The announcement to launch Airtel Zero came soon after the Telecom Regulatory Authority of India (TRAI) released its consultation paper on OTT (Over-the-top) services and invited submissions on introducing OTT charges. Through the Zero platform, app developers and internet service providers (ISPs) would be able to make a part of their entire mobile app free for customers if they pay Airtel a fixed fee for the cost of data transfer incurred while using their services. After the launch, Airtel faced the lot of criticism on social media with users claiming it to be against net neutrality. Later TRAI supported net neutrality and ruled against differential data pricing based on content which resulted in ending zero-rating platforms in India including Facebook Free Basics and Airtel Zero.
