= Harrisonville Telephone Company =

- Industry: Telecommunications
- Founded: 1896
- Headquarters: Waterloo, Illinois, United States
- Website: www.htc.net

Harrisonville Telephone Company (HTC) was founded in Waterloo, Illinois in 1896, and provides communications to southwestern Illinois. HTC is the 6th largest telephone company in Illinois. HTC contains the IP Block 65.87.32.0 - 65.87.63.255, and 216.114.96.0 - 216.114.127.255. HTC is a Tier-2 Internet Service Provider getting their bandwidth from AT&T. HTC offers broadband as well as fiber internet.
