= Mil-OSS =

- Founded: 2009
- Founder: Anthony Vela; Joshua L. Davis; John Scott
- Purpose: Open-source software in the military
- Website: mil-oss.dev
- Formerly called: Military Open Source Software Working Group

Mil-OSS, also known as the Military Open Source Software Working Group, is a group that promotes the use and creation of open-source software in the United States Department of Defense. Mil-OSS is considered a working group of Open Source for America.
