= Fundación Vía Libre =

Fundación Vía Libre of Córdoba, Argentina, is an NGO working on the social implications of information and communication technologies throughout Latin America, with very strong ties to the region's digital rights and software libre community, to academia, to other civil society organizations, and to the global Free Software movement. It was founded in 2000.

Via Libre's work on the role of software libre for the public administration has led to numerous legislative projects demanding the use of free software for all public administration work. The template "free software bill" that Vía Libre together with lawmakers and a large international group of software supporters helped to create, introduce and promote in several Latin American countries was mentioned in the FLOSS report as recommended legislation for all European Union member countries.

Vía Libre took part in the international consortium that executed the FLOSSWorld program within the European Union's 6th Framework Program, led by the University of Maastricht and also was a partner at SELFProject between years 2006/2008. Vía Libre's Support Program for Small and Medium Organizations, co-funded by AVINA Foundation of Switzerland and Argentina's National Agency for Science and Technology, aims at helping small businesses and NGOs introduce libre software in their operations through training, preconfigured software packages and the development of a free ERP tailored to their needs. Vía Libre cooperated heavily with Heinrich-Böll-Stiftung for nine years, working on publications, events and conferences on issues related to copyrights and patents all over Latin America. From February 2008, Vía Libre takes part of FLOSSInclude Project, another European Project within the 7th Framework Program.

== Other fields of interest ==
As a civil rights advocacy group, Vía Libre campaigns for human rights, civil liberties, access to knowledge and the right to privacy in cyberspace. In the last few years, the Foundation has launched campaigns against Electronic Voting, against surveillance and excessive data retention, and for access to knowledge in different fields. From 2008, Vía Libre was also approved by WIPO's General Assembly as an observer at the World Intellectual Property Organization.
