= Free Software Movement of India =

Non-profit organization for support for the free software movement

- Free Software is the future, Future is ours
- Abbreviation: FSMI
- Formation: March 21, 2010; 16 years ago
- Type: Coalition of Organisations
- Purpose: To take free software and its ideology to all computer users and to all sections of society.
- Region served: Indian Union
- President: Prabir Purkayastha
- General Secretary: Kiran Chandra Yarlagada
- Main organ: General Council
- Website: fsmi.in

Free Software Movement of India (FSMI) is a national coalition of various regional and sectoral free software movements operating in different parts of India. The formation of FSMI was announced in the valedictory function of the National Free Software Conference - 2010 held in Bangalore during 20–21 March 2010. FSMI is a pan Indian level initiative to propagate the ideology of free software and to popularize the usage of the free software. One of the declared aims of the movement is to take Free Software and its ideological implications to computer users “across the digital divide”, to under-privileged sections of society.

== Member organisations ==
FSMI differentiates itself from other organisations, forums or user groups in the free software domain by the method of movement building which is primarily grass root and mass movement.

- Regional movements
  - Democratic Alliance of Knowledge Front, Kerala (abbrv. DAKF)
  - Free Software Movement of Delhi/NCR
  - Free Software Movement of Karnataka (abbrv. FSMK)
  - Free Software Movement of Maharashtra (abbrv. FSMM)
  - Free Software Movement of Rajasthan
  - Free Software Foundation Tamilnadu (abbrv. FSFTN)
  - Free Software Movement of West Bengal
  - Swadhin, Odisha
  - Swecha, Telangana & Andhra Pradesh
- Sectoral movements
  - Appropriate Technology Promotion Society
  - Knowledge Commons
  - National Consultative Committee of Computer Teachers Association(abbrv. NCCCTA)
  - Open Source Geospatial Foundation India (abbrv. OSGEO India)

Sectoral movements such as Knowledge Commons, Academics Initiative, OSGeo India and the National Consultative Committee of Computer Teachers (NCCCTA) joined the national coalition at the very initial stage itself.

== Governance ==
FSMI elects the General Council, Executive Committee, Office Bearers including General Secretary & President in FSMI National Conferences.

The founding conference of FSMI elected a General Council having 69 members, an Executive Committee with 28 members with Joseph Thomas as the founding President and Kiran Chandra Yarlagadda as founding General Secretary. The second national conference named as 4Ccon was held in B.S. Abdur Rahman University, Vandalur, Chennai. Prabir Purkayastha was elected as the President and Kiran Chandra Yarlagadda was re-elected as the General Secretary at the second conference.

== Objectives ==
FSMI is a pan Indian level initiative to propagate the ideology of free software and to popularize the usage of the free software. One of the declared aims of the movement is to take Free Software and its ideological implications to computer users “across the digital divide”, to under-privileged sections of society.

== Activities ==
- The All India Council for Technical Education (AICTE) had made mandatory the use of the proprietary Office 365 in all engineering colleges in the country. This mandatory mandate was rescinded after intervention by several groups led by FSMI.
- The Free Software Movement of India (FSMI) has alleged that the new Guidelines for Examination of Computer Related Inventions are illogical. It argues that they violate the spirit and law contained in the amended Patents Act of 1970 and could pose a grave threat to innovation in our country. It cautioned that permitting software patents through the backdoor would severely restrict the innovative capabilities and would adversely impact the creative and entrepreneurial spirit of the youth in the India.
- FSMI has strongly criticized the Indian Telecom Giant Airtel for tampering user's online communications on its 3G network, and maliciously inserting advertisements into its user's data. In a statement issued they also stated that Airtel acted in violation of the privacy rights of at least thousands if not millions of Indian citizens and has rendered their online communications unsafe. FSMI appealed to all groups working on net neutrality to oppose Airtel and Flash Networks illegal and unethical actions and share the code that exposes Airtel widely, thus defeating corporate attempts to muzzle citizens right to free speech (which are only intended to cover up acts of corporate malfeasance).
- A call to Protest on 9 June 2012 for Internet Freedom was given by FSMI to which there was a good response across the country. In Hyderabad police scuttled a planned protest by activists of Free Software Movement of India (FSMI). A good number of software engineers, students and other campaigners assembled near People's Plaza on the Necklace Road.A senior police official threatened FSMI activists with arrest and confiscation of all protest material and T-shirts. The activists contended that theirs was a token protest and they had no plans to organise a rally. The police initially took Y. Kiran Chandra, General Secretary of FSMI in to policy custody along with fellow activists. After hour-long arguments, the police spoke to higher officials who directed them to be shifted to Indira Park. The protestors left the venue with a police patrol team piloting the protest for.
- National Convention for Academics and Research was organised by FSMI in December 2011. The conference was inaugurated by former President of India Dr A P J Abdul Kalam. The concept of Free Software, wherein knowledge is created by the community for the community, without being driven by commercial interests, must be extended to research to solve problems in health care, agriculture, energy and safe drinking water, the former President A.P.J. Abdul Kalam, said.

== Controversy ==
A report in the Malayalam daily Mathrubhumi stated that the new organisation was under the tutelage of certain political parties and that it had driven a wedge in the free software movement in India by sidetracking the Free Software Foundation of India (FSFI). The report in Mathrubhumi was criticized by FSMI in another newspaper for not upholding basic journalistic ethics and code of conduct of contacting the FSMI leadership before making allegations. A rejoinder to the report has been published by FSMI. The Mathrubhumi article stated that the general secretary of FSMI, Kiran Chandra was a representative of Novell while the FSFI website showed that he is on the Board of Directors.

== See also ==
- Free Software Movement
- History of free and open-source software
- List of free software project directories
- List of free and open-source software organizations
- Comparison of free and open-source software licences
- Software Freedom Law Center
