= Open Technologies Alliance (GFOSS) =

Greek non-profit organization

Open Technologies Alliance (GFOSS) (Greek: ΕΕΛΛΑΚ – Οργανισμός Ανοιχτών Τεχνολογιών) is a Greek non-profit organization founded on February 28, 2008 by Greek Universities and Research Institutes. GFOSS was created to "further the cause of Free, Open Source Software (FOSS) and Openness"7 37 universities and research centers are shareholders of GFOSS.

== Members ==
1. Greek Research and Technology Network (GRNET)
2. National and Kapodistrian University of Athens (NKUA)
3. Athena Research Center
4. National Documentation Centre (EKT)
5. National (Metsovian) Technical University of Athens (NTUA)
6. Institute of Communication and Computer Systems (ICCS)
7. Greek Academic Network (GUnet)
8. Athens University of Economics and Business (AUEB)
9. Hellenic Society of Scientists and Professionals of Informatics and Communications
10. National Centre of Scientific Research "Demokritos"
11. University of Western Attica
12. University of the Aegean
13. University of Macedonia (UoM)
14. Aristotle University of Thessaloniki (A.U.Th.)
15. University of Patras (UPatras)
16. Computer Technology Institute and Press "Diophantus"
17. University of Peloponnese (UoP)
18. University of Crete (UoC)
19. Technical University of Crete (TUC)
20. Greek Association of Computer Scientists (EPE)
21. Hellenic Linux User Group (HEL.L.U.G.)
22. Hellenic Association of Computer Engineers (HACE)
23. University of Ioannina (UoI)
24. Hellenic Open University (HOU)
25. Harokopio University (HUA)
26. University of Piraeus (UniPi)
27. International Hellenic University (IHU)
28. University of Western Macedonia (UoWM)
29. University of Cyprus (UCY)
30. University of Thessaly (UTH)
31. Open University of Cyprus
32. Centre for Research and Technology Hellas (CERTH)
33. Demokritus University of Thrace
34. European Public Law Organisation (EPLO)
35. Foundation for Research and Technology Hellas (FORTH)
36. Ionian University
37. Panteion University of Social and Political Sciences

== Members of the Board of Directors of GFOSS – Open Technologies Alliance 2023–2027 ==
Honorary President: Diomidis Spinellis

- President: Ioannis Stamelos, (Aristotle University of Thessaloniki, AUTH), responsible for Open Source Software and Hardware,
- Vice President: Nektarios Koziris (Institute of Communication and Computer Systems, ICCS), responsible for Public Administration and Innovation,
- Vice President: Diomidis Spinellis (Athens University of Economics and Business, AUEB), responsible for Privacy and Security,

Members:

- Georgia Kapitsaki (University of Cyprus), responsible for Open Content and Intellectual Property,
- Theodore Karounos (GFOSS Scientific Committee), responsible for coordination and operations,
- Panagiotis Kranidiotis (GFOSS Scientific Committee), responsible for Local Government and Entrepreneurship,
- Michalis Paraskevas (Computer Technology Institute and Press “Diophantus” (CTI)), responsible for Higher Education and Research,
- Iraklis Varlamis (Harokopeion University), responsible for Open Data,
- Ioannis Vogiatzis (Greek Computer Society), responsible for Primary and Secondary Education.

== Members of the Board of Directors of GFOSS – Open Technologies Alliance 2015–2019 ==
- President: Diomidis Spinellis (Athens University of Economics and Business)
- Vice President: Nektarios Koziris (ICCS), responsible for innovation and entrepreneurship
- Vice President: Theodoros Karounos (NTUA), responsible for coordination and operation

Members:

- Mihalis Vafopoulos (ODI Athens), responsible for Open Data
- Vassilis Vlachos (TEI of Thessaly), responsible for Privacy and Security
- Panayiotis Kranidiotis (Scientific Committee of the GFOSS), responsible for Public Administration and Local Government
- Dimitris Kyriakos (EPE), responsible for Primary and Secondary Education
- Ioannis Stamelos (A.U.Th.), responsible for Higher education and Research
- Prodromos Tiavos (Creative Commons Greece), responsible for Open Content and Copyright
