= Ma3bar =

ma3bar معبر
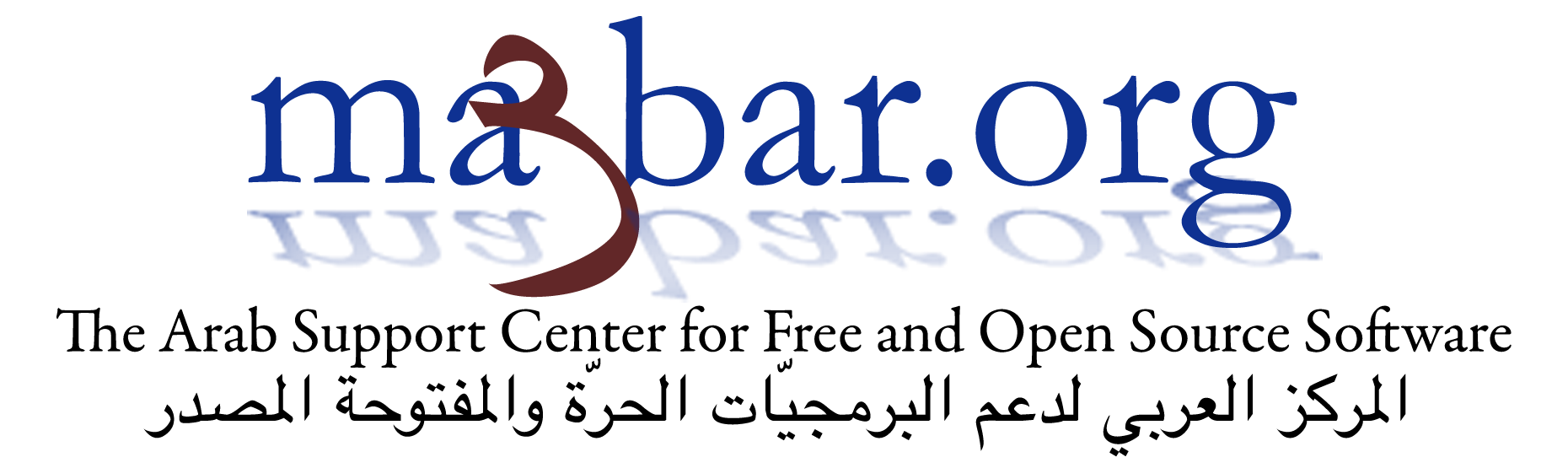
- Logo of Ma3bar
- Available in: English, French, Arabic
- Website: ma3bar.org

ma3bar (معبر) is the Arab Support Center for Free and Open Source Software (المركز العربي لدعم البرمجيات الحرة والمفتوحة المصدر) initiated by UNESCO and UNDP-ICTDAR and hosted by The University of Balamand. The center's main goals are to develop FOSS awareness and to encourage FOSS use and development in the Arab Region. The target groups for the Center are Universities, Research Centers and Governmental Institutions all over the Arab Region, as well as Arab FOSS communities and interested agencies.

== Objectives ==
The United Nations Educational, Scientific, and Cultural Organization (UNESCO), and the United Nations Development Program – Information and Communication Technology for Development in the Arab Region (UNDP–ICTDAR) have come together to initiate Ma3bar, the Arab Support Center for Free and Open Source Software. The objectives of Ma3bar are three-fold:

1. Capacity building by providing the necessary training and assistance in developing the necessary skills and competences in the public and the private sectors, as well as in non-government organizations, and encouraging the inclusion of Free and Open Source Software (FOSS) courses as part of the standard course offerings in universities as well as networking the various FOSS communities that exist in the Arab Region.
2. Support the creation of applications (or toolkits) that will meet the needs of the local market and lead to the strengthening of local and regional expertise.
3. Raise awareness at the government and business levels on the potential and viability of open source solutions and applications as solid alternatives to proprietary software.
