= Free Software Initiative of Japan =

The Free Software Initiative of Japan are a non-profit organization dedicated to supporting Free Software growth and development. It was founded on 10 July 2002 and organized the Free Software Symposium in Tokyo on October 22 and 23 of that year. The organization's founding chairman was Prof. Masayuki Ida, and as of 2006 the current chairman is Niibe Yutaka. As of 2006, FSIJ have been involved in the Google Summer of Code as a mentoring organization, CodeFest Kyoto and CodeFest Japan.
