= Harrogate Tutorial College =

Location
- The Oval; Harrogate, North Yorkshire, HG2 9BA; England; 53.983860°N 1.540600°W

Information
- Type: Private
- Established: 1981
- Closed: 2004
- Department for Education URN: 121761 Tables
- Headmaster: Keith Pollard
- Website: http://www.htcuk.org/ (archived)

Harrogate Tutorial College in Harrogate, North Yorkshire, England was a small co-educational private school. HTC specialised in preparing students for university and teaches GCSE and A-level qualifications in tutorial classes. The college's admissions policy and style of teaching made it a popular choice among pupils of British public schools who had not met the often restrictive academic requirements of their schools to proceed to A-level. Attracting many overseas students wishing to enrol at British universities, the college also provided English language courses which were often taught in combination with academic subjects. Special preparation was offered to Oxford and Cambridge applicants and 90% of HTC students secured places at university.

The college was a member of CIFE and was inspected by the British Accreditation Council.
