= Kuali Foundation =

Non-profit open source software foundation

- Founded: March 2005
- Founder: Indiana University, The University of Arizona, the University of Hawaii, Michigan State University, San Joaquin Delta Community College, Cornell University, NACUBO, rSmart Group
- Type: 501(c)(3)
- Purpose: Enterprise resource planning software for educational institutions
- Website: www.kuali.org

The Kuali Foundation was a non-profit, 501(c)(3) corporation that developed open source enterprise resource planning software for higher education institutions. Kuali products include Student, Financial, Ready, Research, and Build.

Founding partners were Indiana University, The University of Arizona, the University of Hawaii, Michigan State University, San Joaquin Delta Community College, Cornell University, NACUBO, and the rSmart Group.

== History ==
Around 2003, Indiana University administrators were considering alternatives for replacing the existing financial information system. They looked at retooling the current financial system or buying vendor software. In 2004, Indiana University chief information officer Brad Wheeler wrote a paper about the state of open and community source software development in education. This paper helped coalesce a movement among higher ed institutions to create a community source enterprise resource planning software suite.

Wheeler's preliminary work assessed higher education's readiness for a community source financial system project and its applicability across colleges and universities through a planning grant from the Andrew W. Mellon Foundation to National Association of College and University Business Officers (NACUBO) in 2004. In March 2005, after more than a year of evaluation, partner coalescing, and preparatory work, the Kuali Financial System (KFS) received a $2.5 million grant from the Mellon Foundation to help complete the software development. Colorado State University and San Joaquin Delta College became the first to host large-scale installations of the full KFS in 2009. Kuali products now include Student, Financial, Research, Build., and Ready.

Over the next ten years, usage of Kuali had increased substantially, and by 2014 the Kuali Foundation had 74 member institutions.

In 2014, the foundation invested in Kuali, Inc., which is now responsible for the development of Kuali software and offers the software in the cloud for higher ed institutions.

In 2023, feeling the Kuali Inc. was well on its way to accomplishing the mission of software "for education, by education," the Kuali Foundation felt the original work of the foundation was complete. They formally ended their legal entity in September of 2023.

== See also ==
- History of free and open-source software
