= SIP Forum =

The SIP Forum is a nonprofit organization devoted to advancing the adoption of the Session Initiation Protocol (SIP), a signaling protocol for use in initiating, modifying, and terminating an interactive session among two or more users that involves multimedia elements such as voice, video, instant messaging, online games, and virtual reality.

== Mission ==
The SIP Forum performs a variety of activities to accomplish its mission.

- Technical activities. While the IETF is the body that establishes the core SIP protocol definitions in Internet standard documents (RFCs), the SIP Forum performs ancillary technical activities.
  - SIPit events. Previously called Bake-offs, these events are held at least two times a year in various venues around the world. Vendors of products and services that implement and use SIP send engineers and products to the event, and all participants spend a week making their products interoperate with each other. These events have been held since 1998, and have been one of the single most important industry events to help further standards-compliant products. The Enterprise Communications System sipXecs serves as a reference implementation for the SIP standard.
  - SIMPLEt events. These are like SIPit events, but are held specifically to test the interoperability of products that implement the instant messaging and presence components of SIP.
  - Technical working group Recommendations. While the IETF standardizes SIP and ancillary protocols, the IETF is not the right organization to create documents with the force of standards, but which are application-level and use-level documents. The SIP Forum works with the IETF to determine which of these are best handled outside the IETF, and the Forum acts as the technical body to create such Recommendations. (The Forum's process mirrors that of the IETF.)
- Marketing activities. The SIP Forum maintains a website and a Wiki devoted to providing information about SIP, primarily to a technical audience. It also sponsors booths in relevant trade shows, and does other marketing to advance the adoption and use of SIP.

== Members ==
The SIP Forum has two types of members:

- Participant Members. Any interested individual can become a Participant Member at no cost simply by signing up at the Forum website. This allows users to participate in email discussions and other online activities. As of mid-2005, the Forum has over 4,000 Participant Members.
- Full members. Organizations can pay €5000 per year to become a Full Member. Primarily, this gives the Full Member the ability to vote for Forum Board of Director members (as well as list its logo on the Forum page.) As of mid-2005, the Forum has 53 Full Members.

== History ==
Logo as of 2004

The SIP Forum was formed in 1999 by 7 founding Full Member companies. Some of its current Board of Director members have been on the board since its founding.
