= Free Software Foundation of India =

Foundation promoting Free Software movement

Free Software Foundation India
- Abbreviation: FSFI
- Formation: 20 July 2001 (25 years ago)
- Type: Charitable organization
- Headquarters: Kerala, India
- Region served: India
- Affiliations: FSF* network
- Website: fsf.org.in

The Free Software Foundation of India (FSFI) is the Indian sister organisation to the US-based Free Software Foundation. It was founded in Thiruvananthapuram (Trivandrum) (the capital of Kerala) in 2001 as a non-profit Company. The FSFI advocates to promote the use and development of free software in India. This includes educating people about free software, including how it can help the economy of a developing country like India. FSF India regards non-free software as not a solution, but a problem to be solved. Free software is sometimes locally called swatantra software in India.

In 2003, after meeting with FSF founder Richard Stallman, the President of India Dr. Abdul Kalam urged Indian computer scientists and professionals to use free and open-source software in research and development.

== Logo ==
The left side of the FSF India logo resembles the famed Ashoka Chakra, that also appears on the Indian national flag, while its right half is a depiction of a compact disc. The combination of both symbols is intended to draw attention to the similarity between political freedom and free software, the latter of which the FSF promotes.

The Ashoka Chakra, in addition to being a long-standing Buddhist symbol depicting the wheel of time, also resembles Charkha of India's Freedom Struggle and thus in the current context, may symbolize the Indian independence movement which resulted in India's freedom from British occupation.

== See also ==
- Free Software Foundation
- Free Software Foundation Europe
- Free Software Movement of India
- Free Software Movement
