= P.E.S. College of Engineering =

P. E. S. College of Engineering Mandya
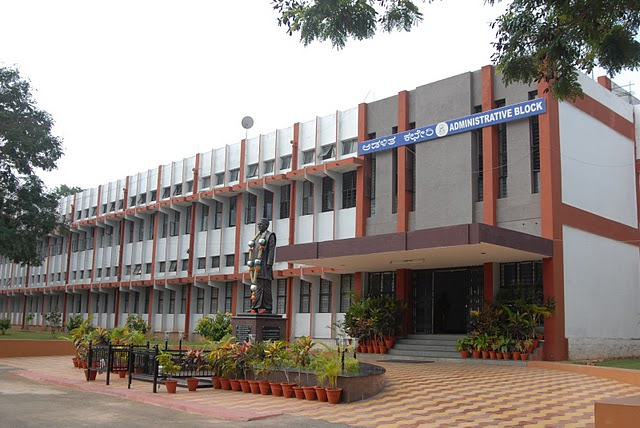
- Administrative Block
- Motto: ಶ್ರದ್ಧಾವಾನ್ ಲಭತೇ ಜ್ಞಾನಂ
- Motto in English: Learning with dedication gives wisdom
- Type: An Autonomous institution under VTU engineering college
- Established: 1962
- Founder: Shri K V Shankaragowda
- Affiliations: VTU, AICTE
- President: Shri. K.S Vijayanand
- Principal: Dr N.L Murali Krishna
- Location: Mandya, Karnataka, 571401, India; 12°31′3.11″N 76°52′43.08″E
- Campus: Urban 62 acres (250,000 m^{2})
- Language: English
- Nickname: PESCE
- Website: pesce.ac.in

P. E. S. College of Engineering (PESCE, standing for "People's Education Society College of Engineering") is an autonomous institute and technical engineering college located in Mandya, Karnataka, India. Established in 1962, it is run by the People's Education Trust. It is an autonomous institute from the year 2008 under Visvesvaraya Technological University, Belgaum and is recognized by AICTE.

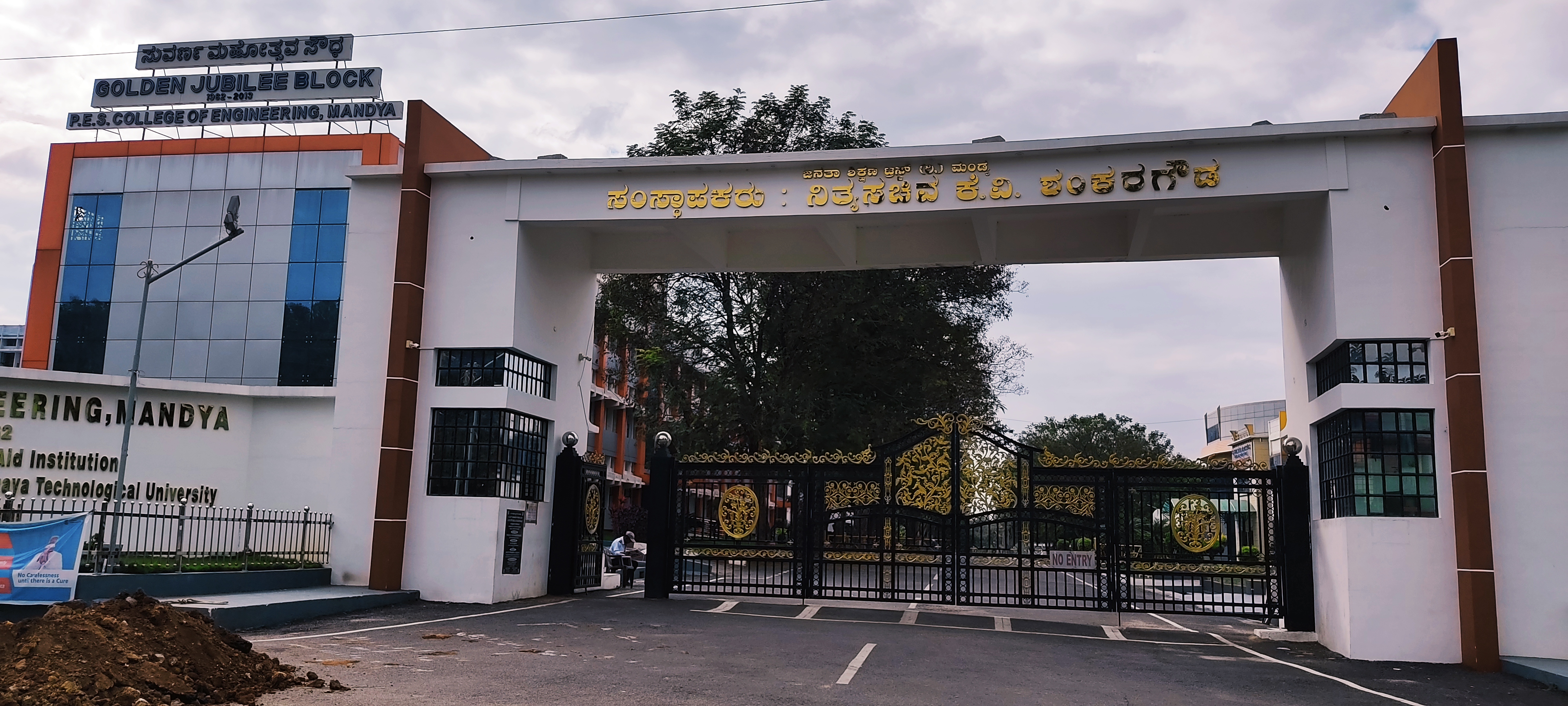
Main entrance

== Rankings ==
The National Institutional Ranking Framework (NIRF) ranked it in the 201-300 band among engineering colleges in 2025 in India.
