= Free Software Movement of Karnataka =

Non-profit organization for support for the free software movement

Free Software Movement Karnataka
- Free Software is the future, Future is ours
- Abbreviation: FSMK
- Formation: April 7, 2009 (17 years ago)
- Type: Not for Profit registered organization
- Purpose: To take free software and its ideology to all computer users and to all sections of society.
- Headquarters: Wilson Garden, Bangalore
- Location: Bangalore
- Region served: Karnataka State
- President: Prof K. Gopinath (IISc, Bangalore)
- General Secretary: Naveen M
- Main organ: General Council
- Affiliations: Free Software Movement of India
- Website: www.fsmk.org

Free Software Movement Karnataka (FSMK) is a non-profit organization working for spreading free software and its ideals. The movement is inspired by software freedom visionaries like Richard Stallman and Eben Moglen. FSMK is one of the member organizations of Free Software Movement of India.

A small organising team was created in 2007 and FSMK's formation was formally announced via several mailing lists on April 7, 2009. The Free Software Movement-Karnataka has a sizable number of followers in Bangalore and South Canara. FSMK has presence in six different districts across Karnataka, namely Bangalore, Mandya, Mysore, Hassan, Mangalore and Tumkur.

== Activities and campaigns ==
In order to build a mass movement for free software, FSMK organizes GNU/Linux User Groups(GLUG) in engineering colleges around Karnataka and currently has around two dozen under it. FSMK hosted the 3rd National Conference on Free Software in Bangalore in the month of March, 2010. More than 1500 participants attended including the delegates from across the country. FSMI, Free Software Movement of India, a platform for all such state level organizations was formed in that National Conference.

FSMK has conducted four major activities after the 2010 National Conference. Free Software Movement-Karnataka and Reva Institute of Technology conducted a State Level Convention for Academicians on Free Software in Research and Teaching in Bangalore. It was a two days convention on 11 and 12 March 2011. The other three events are Winter camp-13 in association with SVIT, Bangalore(January 2013). Swataha-13 in association with PESCE, Mandya(April 2013). With the motto to spread awareness on free software and its philosophy, Free Software Movement of Karnataka (FSMK) along with Jnana Vikas Institute of Technology, Bidadi, organized a 9-days workshop(Summer Camp) between July 20 and 28 at the Institute campus near Bidadi to focus on free software is real freedom to compute.

Akashavaani conducted a discussion on Free Software through its "Yuvavani" program in "Kannada" Language with the members of FSMK Unit from Government Engineering College, Hassan. The Unit named as GLUE (GNU/Linux Users and Enthusiasts) is first of its kind in Hassan.

FSMK conducted protests against internet censorship on April 21, 2012.

FSMK is opposed to the UIDAI project on the grounds that it uses proprietary software and is run by a company that does not conform to privacy laws of the land.

Students from the FSMK supported Community Center participated in the Second National Conference on Free Software held in Kochi.

Efforts are on to localise GNU Health to Kannada.

In Karnataka many DTP Shops, Photography Studios, Ad Agencies, etc. are facing raids from the proprietary companies. These shops are forced to pay huge amount of license fee even if they are using the outdated versions. In the name of software support they are forced to buy new versions and in turn new hardware too which is not economically feasible for many. FSMK is trying to help these small scale enterprises to switch to Free Software alternatives like GIMP, Inkscape, Scribus, Blender, etc.

=== Internet Censorship ===
On 21 April 2012, FSMK conducted a street level activity to register its protest against the Internet Censorship. The protest was organised by the Free Software Movement of Karnataka (FSMK), in collaboration with the Software Freedom Law Centre. The performances, singing and short speeches delivered by students and bloggers culminated in a candle light vigil.

=== Wikileaks Campaign ===
To popularize the role of internet in democratic opinion and information sharing, Free Software Movement of Karnataka (FSMK) has done an online campaign that would explain to the public the underlying technology and process behind Wikileaks and the reason to oppose the government's attempt to regulate information and views shared on internet platforms. This was done in the month of May, 2012.

=== Section 66A of IT Act ===
On 2 December 2012, FSMK conducted a protest in front of Bangalore Town Hall against the section 66A of Indian IT Act.

=== Campaign Against Internet Surveillance by NSA (US) & CMS(India) ===
On 6 October 2013, FSMK conducted session on awareness about electronic surveillance and importance of internet privacy. During this session, various tools which can be used to safeguard one's privacy while using internet was also discussed.

=== Campaign in support of NetNeutrality ===
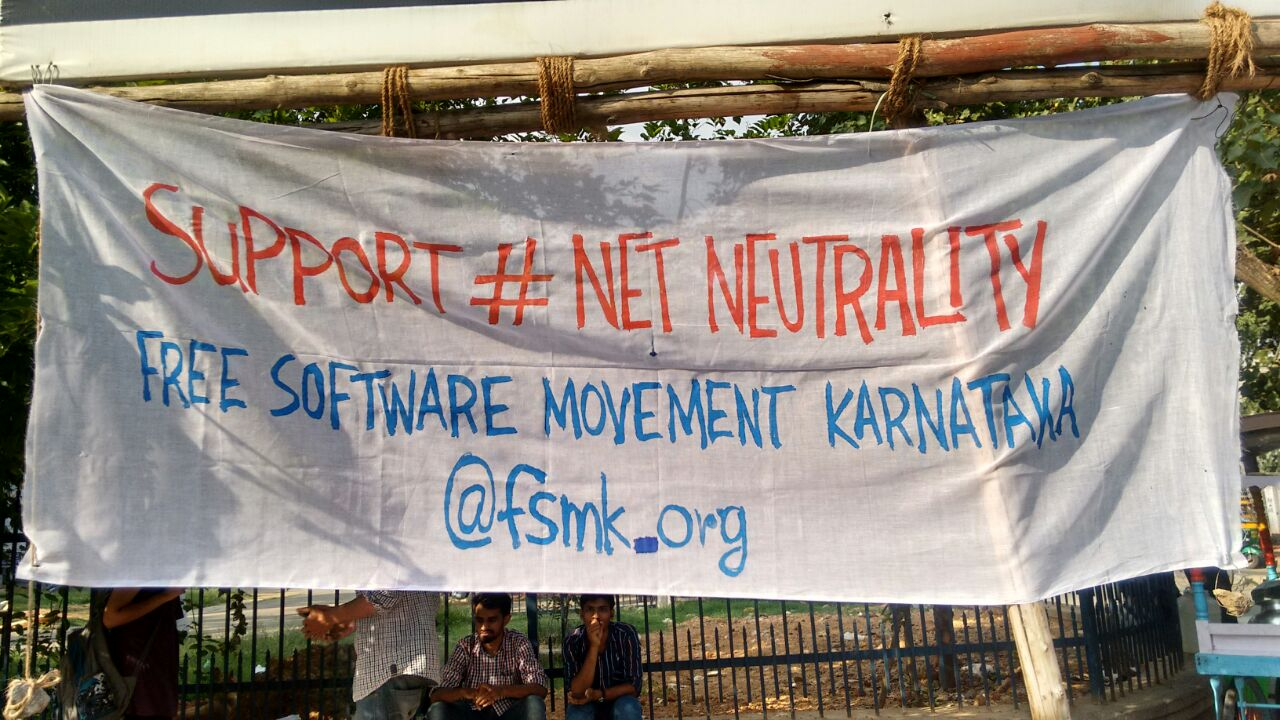
FSMK's walkathon in support of NetNeutrality Banner

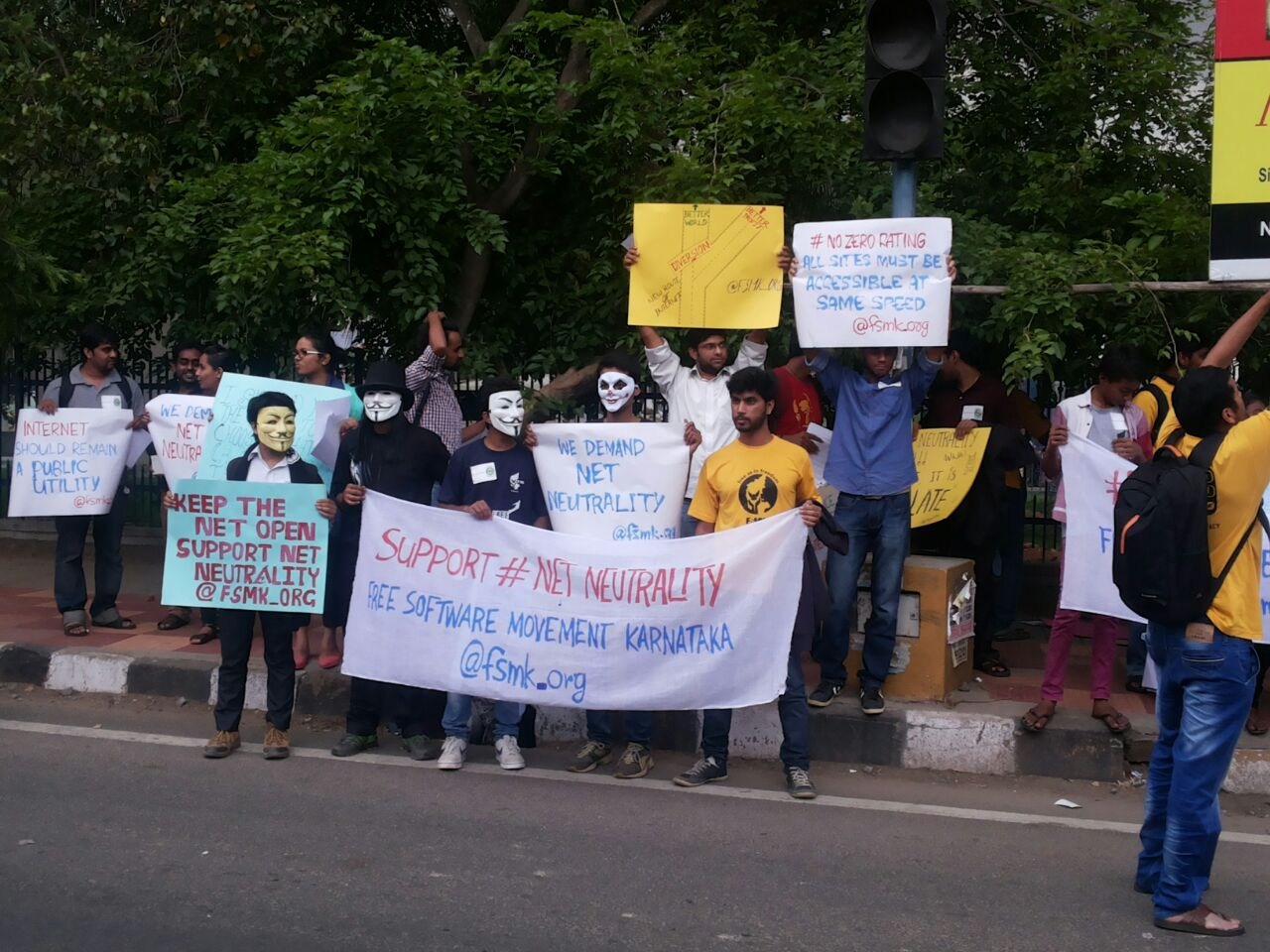
FSMK's walkathon in support of NetNeutrality

On 23 April 2015, as part of Free Software Movement of India's call for campaign in support of NetNeutrality, FSMK organized a walkathon from National Games Village to Forum Mall in Bangalore.
